= SM UB-11 =

German Type UB I-class submarine

History

German Empire
- Name: UB-11
- Ordered: 15 October 1914
- Builder: AG Weser, Bremen
- Yard number: 220
- Laid down: 7 November 1914
- Launched: 2 March 1915
- Commissioned: 4 March 1915
- Stricken: 19 February 1919
- Fate: Broken up, 3 February 1920

General characteristics
- Class & type: Type UB I submarine
- Displacement: 127 t (125 long tons) surfaced; 141 t (139 long tons) submerged
- Length: 27.88 m (91 ft 6 in) (o/a)
- Beam: 3.15 m (10 ft 4 in)
- Draft: 3.03 m (9 ft 11 in)
- Installed power: 1 × Körting 4-cylinder diesel engine, 59 bhp (44 kW); 1 × Siemens-Schuckert electric motor, 119 shp (89 kW)
- Propulsion: 1 × propeller shaft
- Speed: 7.45 knots (13.80 km/h; 8.57 mph) surfaced; 6.24 knots (11.56 km/h; 7.18 mph) submerged
- Range: 1,500 nmi (2,800 km; 1,700 mi) at 5 knots (9.3 km/h; 5.8 mph) surfaced; 45 nmi (83 km; 52 mi) at 4 knots (7.4 km/h; 4.6 mph) submerged
- Test depth: 50 metres (160 ft)
- Complement: 14
- Armament: 2 × 45 cm (17.7 in) bow torpedo tubes; 2 × torpedoes; 1 × 8 mm (0.31 in) machine gun
- Notes: 33-second diving time

Service record
- Commanders: Oblt. Ralph Wenninger; 4–10 March 1915
- Operations: No patrols
- Victories: None

SM UB-11 was a German Type UB I submarine or U-boat in the German Imperial Navy (German: Kaiserliche Marine) during World War I. UB-11 was ordered in October 1914 and was laid down at the AG Weser shipyard in Bremen in November. UB-11 was a little under 28 metres (92 ft) in length and displaced between 127 and 141 tonnes (125 and 139 long tons), depending on whether surfaced or submerged. She carried two torpedoes for her two bow torpedo tubes and was also armed with a deck-mounted machine gun. She was launched and commissioned as SM UB-11 in March 1915. (Note: "SM" stands for "Seiner Majestät" (English: His Majesty's) and combined with the U for Unterseeboot would be translated as His Majesty's Submarine.)

UB-11's commanding officer at commissioning only remained in charge of the ship for a week. Sources do not report any more commanding officers assigned through the end of the war, so it's not clear if the submarine remained in commission. UB-11 was reported in use as a training vessel at Kiel in September 1915. The U-boat made no war patrols and sank no ships during the war, which may indicate that the vessel remained in a training role. At the end of the war, UB-11 was deemed unseaworthy and unable to surrender at Harwich with the rest of Germany's U-boat fleet. She remained in Germany where she was broken up by Stinnes in February 1920.

== Design and construction ==
After the German Army's rapid advance along the North Sea coast in the earliest stages of World War I, the German Imperial Navy found itself without suitable submarines that could be operated in the narrow and shallow seas off Flanders. Project 34, a design effort begun in mid-August 1914, produced the Type UB I design: a small submarine that could be shipped by rail to a port of operations and quickly assembled. Constrained by railroad size limitations, the UB I design called for a boat about 28 metres (92 ft) long and displacing about 125 tonnes (123 long tons) with two torpedo tubes. (Note: A further refinement of the design—replacing the torpedo tubes with mine chutes but changing little else—evolved into the Type UC I coastal minelaying submarine. See: Miller, p. 458.)

UB-11 was part of the initial allotment of seven submarines—numbered UB-9 to UB-15—ordered on 15 October from AG Weser of Bremen, just shy of two months after planning for the class began. UB-11 was laid down by Weser in Bremen on 7 November. As built, UB-11 was 27.88 metres (91 ft 6 in) long, 3.15 metres (10 ft 4 in) abeam, and had a draft of 3.03 metres (9 ft 11 in). She had a single 59-brake-horsepower (44 kW) Körting 4-cylinder diesel engine for surface travel, and a single 119-shaft-horsepower (89 kW) Siemens-Schuckert electric motor for underwater travel, both attached to a single propeller shaft. Her top speeds were 7.45 knots (13.80 km/h; 8.57 mph), surfaced, and 6.24 knots (11.56 km/h; 7.18 mph), submerged. At more moderate speeds, she could sail up to 1,500 nautical miles (2,800 km; 1,700 mi) on the surface before refueling, and up to 45 nautical miles (83 km; 52 mi) submerged before recharging her batteries. Like all boats of the class, UB-11 was rated to a diving depth of 50 metres (160 ft), and could completely submerge in 33 seconds.

UB-11 was armed with two 45-centimeter (17.7 in) torpedoes in two bow torpedo tubes. She was also outfitted for a single 8-millimeter (0.31 in) machine gun on deck. UB-11's standard complement consisted of one officer and thirteen enlisted men. After work on UB-11 was complete at the Weser yard, she was launched on 2 March.

== Career ==
The submarine was commissioned into the German Imperial Navy as SM UB-11 on 4 March 1915 under the command of Kapitänleutnant (Kapt.) Ralph Wenninger, a 25-year-old first-time U-boat commander. (Note: Wenninger was in the Navy's April 1907 cadet class with 34 other future U-boat captains, including Werner Fürbringer, Heino von Heimburg, Hans Howaldt, and Otto Steinbrinck. See: Helgason, Guðmundur. "WWI Officer Crews: Crew 4/07". German and Austrian U-boats of World War I - Kaiserliche Marine - Uboat.net.) Wenninger was only in command of UB-11 for a week. Sources do not indicate who, if anyone, succeeded him as commander of UB-11, or if UB-11 remained in commission.

According to authors R. H. Gibson and Maurice Prendergast, UB-11 had been assigned to the Kiel Periscope School by September 1915. Uboat.net reports that UB-11 undertook no war patrols and had no successes against enemy ships, which may indicate that the vessel remained in use only as a training vessel.

At the end of the war, the Allies required all German U-boats to be sailed to Harwich for surrender. UB-11 was one of eight U-boats deemed unseaworthy and allowed to remain in Germany. (Note: The other seven boats were U-1, U-2, U-4, U-17, and three fellow Type UB I boats, UB-2, UB-5, and UB-9.) UB-11 was broken up by Stinnes on 3 February 1920.

== Bibliography ==
- Bendert, Harald (2000). Die UB-Boote der Kaiserlichen Marine, 1914-1918. Einsätze, Erfolge, Schicksal (in German). Hamburg: Verlag E.S. Mittler & Sohn GmbH. ISBN 3-8132-0713-7.
- Gröner, Erich; Jung, Dieter; Maass, Martin (1991). "U-boats and Mine Warfare Vessels". German Warships 1815–1945. Vol. 2. Translated by Thomas, Keith; Magowan, Rachel. London: Conway Maritime Press. ISBN 0-85177-593-4.
- Gardiner, Robert; Gray, Randal, eds. (1985). Conway's All the World's Fighting Ships 1906–1921. Annapolis, Maryland: Naval Institute Press. ISBN 978-0-87021-907-8. OCLC 12119866.
- Gibson, R. H.; Maurice Prendergast (2003) [1931]. The German Submarine War, 1914–1918. Annapolis, Maryland: Naval Institute Press. ISBN 9781591143147. OCLC 52924732.
- Karau, Mark D. (2003). Wielding the Dagger: the MarineKorps Flandern and the German War Effort, 1914–1918. Westport, Connecticut: Praeger. ISBN 978-0-313-32475-8. OCLC 51204317.
- Miller, David (2002). The Illustrated Directory of Submarines of the World. St. Paul, Minnesota: MBI Pub. Co. ISBN 978-0-7603-1345-9. OCLC 50208951.
- Tarrant, V. E. (1989). The U-Boat Offensive: 1914–1945. Annapolis, Maryland: Naval Institute Press. ISBN 978-0-87021-764-7. OCLC 20338385.
- Williamson, Gordon (2002). U-boats of the Kaiser's Navy. Oxford: Osprey. ISBN 978-1-84176-362-0. OCLC 48627495.
