= SM UB-2 =

German Type UB I-class submarine

- UB-2 in port at Flanders

History

German Empire
- Name: UB-2
- Ordered: 15 November 1914
- Builder: Germaniawerft, Kiel
- Yard number: 240
- Laid down: 1 November 1914
- Launched: 13 February 1915
- Commissioned: 10 February 1915
- Stricken: 19 February 1919
- Fate: Broken up, 3 February 1920

General characteristics
- Class & type: Type UB I submarine
- Displacement: 127 t (125 long tons) surfaced; 142 t (140 long tons) submerged
- Length: 28.10 m (92 ft 2 in) (o/a)
- Beam: 3.15 m (10 ft 4 in)
- Draft: 3.03 m (9 ft 11 in)
- Propulsion: 1 × propeller shaft; 1 × Daimler 4-cylinder diesel engine, 59 bhp (44 kW); 1 × Siemens-Schuckert electric motor, 119 shp (89 kW)
- Speed: 6.47 knots (11.98 km/h; 7.45 mph) surfaced; 5.51 knots (10.20 km/h; 6.34 mph) submerged
- Range: 1,650 nmi (3,060 km; 1,900 mi) at 5 knots (9.3 km/h; 5.8 mph) surfaced; 45 nmi (83 km; 52 mi) at 4 knots (7.4 km/h; 4.6 mph)
- Test depth: 50 metres (160 ft)
- Complement: 14
- Armament: 2 × 45 cm (17.7 in) bow torpedo tubes; 2 × torpedoes; 1 × 8 mm (0.31 in) machine gun
- Notes: 33-second diving time

Service record
- Part of: Flandern Flotilla; 10 May 1915 – 19 March 1916; Baltic Flotilla; 19 March – 4 December 1916; Training Flotilla; 4 December 1916 – 11 November 1918
- Commanders: Oblt.z.S. Werner Fürbringer; 20 February 1915 – 7 March 1916; Oblt.z.S. Karl Neumann; 8 March – 4 April 1916; Oblt.z.S. Thomas Bieber; 5 April – 1 July 1916; Oblt.z.S. Harald von Keyserlingk; 2 July – 3 December 1916
- Operations: 38 patrols
- Victories: 10 merchant ships sunk (1,117 GRT); 1 auxiliary warship sunk (257 GRT)

SM UB-2 was a German Type UB I submarine or U-boat in the German Imperial Navy (German: Kaiserliche Marine) during World War I. She sank eleven ships during her career and was broken up in Germany in 1920.

UB-2 was ordered in October 1914 and was laid down at the Germaniawerft shipyard in Kiel in November. UB-2 was a little more than 28 metres (92 ft) in length and displaced between 127 and 142 tonnes (125 and 140 long tons), depending on whether surfaced or submerged. She carried two torpedoes for her two bow torpedo tubes and was also armed with a deck-mounted machine gun. She was launched and commissioned as SM UB-2 in February 1915. (Note: "SM" stands for "Seiner Majestät" (English: His Majesty's) and combined with the U for Unterseeboot would be translated as His Majesty's Submarine.)

When UB-2 sailed to join the Flanders Flotilla in May 1915, she became the only member of her class to not be shipped by rail to Antwerp to join the unit. While in the flotilla, UB-2 sank eleven British ships of 1,374 gross register tons (GRT) under the command of Kptlt. Werner Fürbringer. The U-boat was assigned to the Baltic Flotilla in March 1916 relegated to a training role from December that same year. At the end of the war, UB-2 was deemed unseaworthy and unable to surrender at Harwich with the rest of Germany's U-boat fleet. She remained in Germany where she was broken up by Stinnes in February 1920.

== Design and construction ==
After the German Army's rapid advance along the North Sea coast in the earliest stages of World War I, the German Imperial Navy found itself without suitable submarines that could be operated in the narrow and shallow environment off Flanders. Project 34, a design effort begun in mid-August 1914, produced the Type UB I design: a small submarine that could be shipped by rail to a port of operations and quickly assembled. Constrained by railroad size limitations, the UB I design called for a boat about 28 metres (92 ft) long and displacing about 125 tonnes (123 long tons) with two torpedo tubes. (Note: A further refinement of the design—replacing the torpedo tubes with mine chutes but changing little else—evolved into the Type UC I coastal minelaying submarine. See: Miller, p. 458.) UB-2 was part of the initial allotment of eight submarines—numbered UB-1 to UB-8—ordered on 15 October from Germaniawerft of Kiel, just shy of two months after planning for the class began.

UB-2 was laid down by Germaniawerft on 1 November, one of the first two boats of the class started. She was launched at Kiel on 13 February 1915. As built, UB-2 was 28.10 metres (92 ft 2 in) long, 3.15 metres (10 ft 4 in) abeam, and had a draft of 3.03 metres (9 ft 11 in). She had a single 59-brake-horsepower (44 kW) Daimler 4-cylinder diesel engine for surface travel, and a single 119-shaft-horsepower (89 kW) Siemens-Schuckert electric motor for underwater travel, both attached to a single propeller shaft. Her top speeds were 6.47 knots (11.98 km/h; 7.45 mph), surfaced, and 5.51 knots (10.20 km/h; 6.34 mph), submerged. At more moderate speeds, she could sail up to 1,650 nautical miles (3,060 km; 1,900 mi) on the surface before refueling, and up to 45 nautical miles (83 km; 52 mi) submerged before recharging her batteries. Like all boats of the class, UB-2 was rated to a diving depth of 50 metres (160 ft), and could completely submerge in 33 seconds.

UB-2 was armed with two 45-centimeter (17.7 in) torpedoes in two bow torpedo tubes. She was also outfitted for a single 8-millimeter (0.31 in) machine gun on deck. UB-2's standard complement consisted of one officer and thirteen enlisted men.

== Service career ==
The submarine was commissioned into the German Imperial Navy as SM UB-2 on 20 February under the command of Kapitänleutnant Werner Fürbringer, a 26-year-old native of Braunschweig, (Note: Fürbringer was in the Navy's April 1907 cadet class with 34 other future U-boat captains, including Heino von Heimburg, Hans Howaldt, Otto Steinbrinck, and Ralph Wenninger. See: Helgason, Guðmundur. "WWI Officer Crews: Crew 4/07". German and Austrian U-boats of World War I - Kaiserliche Marine - Uboat.net.) and underwent trials in German home waters.

UB-2 sailed from Germany to Flanders to join the Flanders Flotilla (German: U-boote des Marinekorps U-Flotille Flandern) on 10 May 1915, and was the only UB I or UC I boat in the flotilla to not be shipped to Antwerp by rail. When UB-2 joined the flotilla, Germany was in the midst of its first submarine offensive, begun in February. During this campaign, enemy vessels in the German-defined war zone (German: Kriegsgebiet), which encompassed all waters around the United Kingdom (including the English Channel), were to be sunk. Vessels of neutral countries were not to be attacked unless they definitively could be identified as enemy vessels operating under a false flag.

The UB I boats of the Flanders Flotilla were initially limited to patrols in the Hoofden, the southern portion of the North Sea between the United Kingdom and the Netherlands. On 9 and 10 June, while patrolling in this area 50 to 60 nautical miles (93 to 111 km; 58 to 69 mi) southeast of Lowestoft, UB-2 sank six British fishing smacks with a combined tonnage of just under 300 GRT, the largest being Intrepid of 59 GRT. All six of the smacks—sailing vessels traditionally rigged with red ochre sails—were stopped, boarded by crewmen from UB-2, and sunk with explosives.

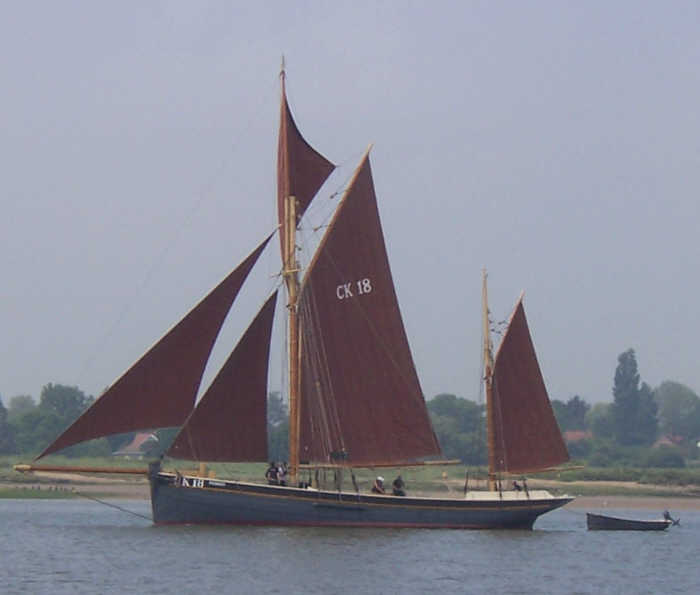
The majority of UB-2's victims were fishing smacks, traditionally outfitted with red ochre sails.

After UB-2's sister boat UB-6 pioneered a route around past British anti-submarine nets and mines in the Straits of Dover in late June, boats of the flotilla began to patrol the western English Channel. UB-2, UB-5, and UB-10 soon followed with patrols in the Channel. Even though none of the boats sank any ships, by successfully completing their voyages they helped further prove the feasibility of defeating the British countermeasures in the Straits of Dover.

On 28 August, UB-2 was patrolling in the Corton–Yarmouth area when she sank the British trawler Miura. At 257 GRT, Miura bested Intrepid as the largest vessel sunk by UB-2 to-date. Early the following month, UB-2 sank another two fishing smacks 44 nautical miles (81 km; 51 mi) east-southeast of Lowestoft: the 57 GRT Constance, and the 44 GRT Emanuel. Three days later, UB-2 sank 47 GRT smack Boy Ernie about 58 nautical miles (107 km; 67 mi) east of Cromer. As with the six vessels sunk in June, all three were stopped by UB-2 and sunk with explosives.

Germany's submarine offensive was suspended on 18 September by the chief of the Admiralstab, Admiral Henning von Holtzendorff, In response to American demands after German submarines had sunk the Cunard Line steamer Lusitania in May 1915 and other high-profile sinkings in August and September. Holtzendorff's directive from ordered all U-boats out of the English Channel and the South-Western Approaches and required that all submarine activity in the North Sea be conducted strictly along prize regulations. UB-2 did not sink any vessels over the next four months.

The German Imperial Navy began its second submarine offensive in February 1916, declaring, among other provisions, that all enemy vessels in the war zone were to be destroyed without warning. On 26 February 1916, UB-2 torpedoed and sank the cargo ship Arbonne, in what was ultimately her last wartime success. The British steamer—at 672 GRT, the largest ship sunk by UB-2—went down with a loss of all fourteen of her crew.

In early March, Kapitänleutnant Fürbringer was succeeded by the former commander of UB-13, Kptlt. Karl Neumann, who had been in the same cadet class as Fürbringer. Fürbringer went on to command six other U-boats, and was responsible for sinking nearly 100,000 tons of shipping. In 1933 he published a memoir of his World War I U-boat service, Alarm! Tauchen!!: U-boot in Kampf und Sturm, which included an overview of his career, including his time on UB-2.

By early February, the Flanders Flotilla was beginning to receive the newer, larger Type UB II boats. UB-2 was transferred into the Baltic Flotilla (German: U-boote der Ostseetreitträfte V. U-Halbflotille) about a week after Neumann took command. Boats of the Baltic flotilla were based at either Kiel, Danzig, or Libau, but where UB-2 was stationed during this time is not reported in sources. While UB-2 was in the Baltic Flotilla, Neumann was succeeded by Oberleutnant zur See (Oblt.z.S.) Thomas Bieber in April, who was in turn succeeded by Oblt.z.S. Harald von Keyserlingk in July. In early December, Keyserlingk was reassigned from UB-2 to UB-36, and UB-2 was transferred to training duties. According to authors R.H. Gibson and Maurice Prendergast, submarines assigned to training duties were "war-worn craft" unfit for service.

At the end of the war, the Allies required all German U-boats to be sailed to Harwich for surrender. UB-2 was one of eight U-boats deemed unseaworthy and allowed to remain in Germany. (Note: The other seven boats were U-1, U-2, U-4, U-17, and three fellow Type UB I boats, UB-5, UB-9, and UB-11.) UB-2 was broken up by Stinnes on 3 February 1920.

== Summary of raiding history ==
Ships sunk or damaged by SM UB-2
Date	Name	Nationality	Tonnage (Note: Tonnages are in gross register tons)	Fate
9 June 1915	Britannia	United Kingdom	43	Sunk
9 June 1915	Edward	United Kingdom	52	Sunk
9 June 1915	Laurestina	United Kingdom	48	Sunk
9 June 1915	Qui Vive	United Kingdom	50	Sunk
9 June 1915	Welfare	United Kingdom	45	Sunk
10 June 1915	Intrepid	United Kingdom	59	Sunk
23 August 1915	HMT Miura	Royal Navy	257	Sunk
7 September 1915	Constance	United Kingdom	57	Sunk
7 September 1915	Emanuel	United Kingdom	44	Sunk
10 September 1915	Boy Ernie	United Kingdom	47	Sunk
26 February 1916	Arbonne	United Kingdom	672	Sunk
		Total:	1,374	

== Bibliography ==
- Bendert, Harald (2000). Die UB-Boote der Kaiserlichen Marine, 1914-1918. Einsätze, Erfolge, Schicksal (in German). Hamburg: Verlag E.S. Mittler & Sohn GmbH. ISBN 3-8132-0713-7.
- Gröner, Erich; Jung, Dieter; Maass, Martin (1991). U-boats and Mine Warfare Vessels. German Warships 1815–1945. Vol. 2. Translated by Thomas, Keith; Magowan, Rachel. London: Conway Maritime Press. ISBN 0-85177-593-4.
- Gardiner, Robert; Gray, Randal, eds. (1985). Conway's All the World's Fighting Ships 1906–1921. Annapolis, Maryland: Naval Institute Press. ISBN 978-0-87021-907-8. OCLC 12119866.
- Gibson, R. H.; Maurice Prendergast (2003) [1931]. The German Submarine War, 1914–1918. Annapolis, Maryland: Naval Institute Press. ISBN 9781591143147. OCLC 52924732.
- Karau, Mark D. (2003). Wielding the Dagger: the MarineKorps Flandern and the German War Effort, 1914–1918. Westport, Connecticut: Praeger. ISBN 978-0-313-32475-8. OCLC 51204317.
- Miller, David (2002). The Illustrated Directory of Submarines of the World. St. Paul, Minnesota: MBI Pub. Co. ISBN 978-0-7603-1345-9. OCLC 50208951.
- Tarrant, V. E. (1989). The U-Boat Offensive: 1914–1945. Annapolis, Maryland: Naval Institute Press. ISBN 978-0-87021-764-7. OCLC 20338385.
- Williamson, Gordon (2002). U-boats of the Kaiser's Navy. Oxford: Osprey. ISBN 978-1-84176-362-0. OCLC 48627495.
