= SM UB-5 =

German Imperial Navy's Type UB I submarine

- SM UB-5 docked in Flanders in 1915

History

German Empire
- Name: UB-5
- Ordered: 15 November 1914
- Builder: Germaniawerft, Kiel
- Yard number: 243
- Laid down: 22 November 1914
- Launched: March 1915
- Commissioned: 25 March 1915
- Stricken: 19 February 1919
- Fate: Broken up, 1919

General characteristics
- Class & type: Type UB I submarine
- Displacement: 127 t (125 long tons) surfaced; 142 t (140 long tons) submerged
- Length: 28.10 m (92 ft 2 in) (o/a)
- Beam: 3.15 m (10 ft 4 in)
- Draught: 3.03 m (10 ft)
- Propulsion: 1 × propeller shaft; 1 × Daimler 4-cylinder diesel engine, 59 bhp (44 kW); 1 × Siemens-Schuckert electric motor, 119 shp (89 kW)
- Speed: 6.47 knots (11.98 km/h; 7.45 mph) surfaced; 5.51 knots (10.20 km/h; 6.34 mph) submerged
- Range: 1,650 nmi (3,060 km; 1,900 mi) at 5 knots (9.3 km/h; 5.8 mph) surfaced; 45 nmi (83 km; 52 mi) at 4 knots (7.4 km/h; 4.6 mph)
- Test depth: 50 metres (160 ft)
- Complement: 14
- Armament: 2 × 45 cm (17.7 in) bow torpedo tubes; 2 × torpedoes; 1 × 8 mm (0.31 in) machine gun
- Notes: 33-second diving time

Service record
- Part of: Flanders Flotilla; March – October 1915; Baltic Flotilla; 9 October 1915 – 21 September 1916; Training Flotilla; 21 September 1916 – 11 November 1918
- Commanders: Oblt. Wilhelm Smiths; 25 March 1915 – 21 September 1916
- Operations: 24 patrols
- Victories: 5 merchant ships sunk (996 GRT)

SM UB-5 was a German Type UB I submarine or U-boat in the Imperial German Navy (German: Kaiserliche Marine) during World War I. She sank five ships during her career and was broken up in Germany in 1919.

UB-5 was ordered in October 1914 and was laid down at the Germaniawerft shipyard in Kiel in November. UB-5 was a little more than 28 metres (92 ft) in length and displaced between 127 and 142 tonnes (125 and 140 long tons), depending on whether surfaced or submerged. She carried two torpedoes for her two bow torpedo tubes and was also armed with a deck-mounted machine gun. UB-5 was broken into sections and shipped by rail to Antwerp for reassembly. She was launched and commissioned there as SM UB-5 in March 1915. (Note: "SM" stands for "Seiner Majestät" (English: His Majesty's) and combined with the U for Unterseeboot would be translated as His Majesty's Submarine.)

UB-5 was initially assigned to the Flanders Flotilla in March 1915 and sank five British ships of 996 gross register tons (GRT) under the command of Wilhelm Smiths. The U-boat was assigned to the Baltic Flotilla in October 1915, and relegated to a training role from September 1916. At the end of the war, UB-5 was deemed unseaworthy and unable to surrender at Harwich with the rest of Germany's U-boat fleet. She remained in Germany where she was broken up by Dräger at Lübeck, Germany, in 1919.

== Design and construction ==
After the German Army's rapid advance along the North Sea coast in the earliest stages of World War I, the Imperial German Navy found itself without suitable submarines that could be operated in the narrow and shallow environment off Flanders. Project 34, a design effort begun in mid-August 1914, produced the Type UB I design: a small submarine that could be shipped by rail to a port of operations and quickly assembled. Constrained by railroad size limitations, the UB I design called for a boat about 28 metres (92 ft) long and displacing about 125 tonnes (123 long tons) with two torpedo tubes. (Note: A further refinement of the design—replacing the torpedo tubes with mine chutes but changing little else—evolved into the Type UC I coastal minelaying submarine. See: Miller, p. 458.) UB-5 was part of the initial allotment of eight submarines—numbered UB-1 to UB-8—ordered on 15 October from Germaniawerft of Kiel, just shy of two months after planning for the class began.

UB-5 was laid down by Germaniawerft in Kiel on 22 November. As built, UB-5 was 28.10 metres (92 ft 2 in) long, 3.15 metres (10 ft 4 in) abeam, and had a draft of 3.03 metres (9 ft 11 in). She had a single 59-brake-horsepower (44 kW) Daimler 4-cylinder diesel engine for surface travel, and a single 119-shaft-horsepower (89 kW) Siemens-Schuckert electric motor for underwater travel, both attached to a single propeller shaft. Her top speeds were 6.47 knots (11.98 km/h; 7.45 mph), surfaced, and 5.51 knots (10.20 km/h; 6.34 mph), submerged. At more moderate speeds, she could sail up to 1,650 nautical miles (3,060 km; 1,900 mi) on the surface before refueling, and up to 45 nautical miles (83 km; 52 mi) submerged before recharging her batteries. Like all boats of the class, UB-5 was rated to a diving depth of 50 metres (160 ft), and could completely submerge in 33 seconds.

UB-5 was armed with two 45-centimeter (17.7 in) torpedoes in two bow torpedo tubes. She was also outfitted for a single 8-millimeter (0.31 in) machine gun on deck. UB-5's standard complement consisted of one officer and thirteen enlisted men.

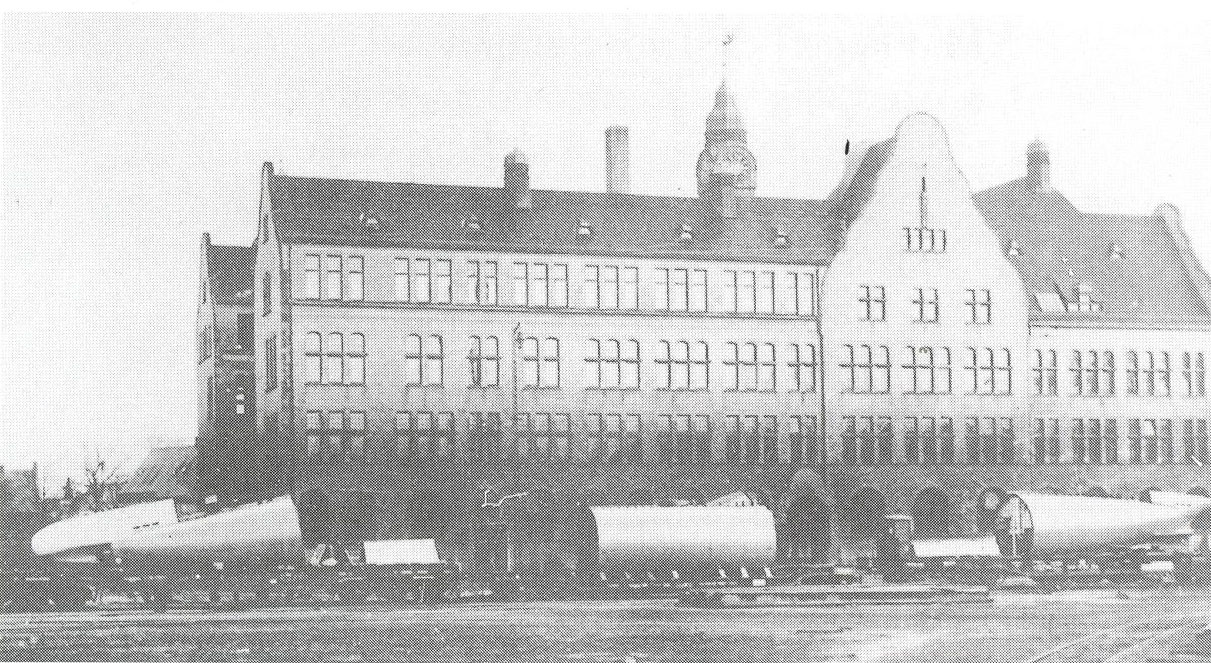
U-Boat ready for rail transport

After work on UB-5 was complete at the Germaniwerft yard, UB-5 was readied for rail shipment. The process of shipping a UB I boat involved breaking the submarine down into what was essentially a knock down kit. Each boat was broken into approximately fifteen pieces and loaded onto eight railway flatcars. In early 1915, the sections of UB-5 were shipped to Antwerp for assembly in what was typically a two- to three-week process. After UB-5 was assembled and launched sometime in March, she was loaded on a barge and taken through canals to Bruges where she underwent trials.

== Service career ==
The submarine was commissioned into the German Imperial Navy as SM UB-5 on 25 March under the command of Oberleutnant zur See Wilhelm Smiths, a 28-year-old first-time U-boat commander. (Note: Smiths was in the Navy's April 1906 cadet class with 34 other future U-boat captains, including Wilhelm Marschall, Matthias Graf von Schmettow, Max Viebeg, and Erwin Waßner. See: Helgason, Guðmundur. "WWI Officer Crews: Crew 4/06". German and Austrian U-boats of World War I - Kaiserliche Marine - Uboat.net.) UB-5 soon joined the other UB I boats then comprising the Flanders Flotilla (German: U-boote des Marinekorps U-Flotille Flandern), which had been organized on 29 March. When UB-5 joined the flotilla, Germany was in the midst of its first submarine offensive, begun in February. During this campaign, enemy vessels in the German-defined war zone (German: Kriegsgebiet), which encompassed all waters around the United Kingdom (including the English Channel), were to be sunk. Vessels of neutral countries were not to be attacked unless they definitively could be identified as enemy vessels operating under a false flag.

The UB I boats of the Flanders Flotilla were initially limited to patrols in the Hoofden, the southern portion of the North Sea between the United Kingdom and the Netherlands. UB-4 made the first sortie of the flotilla on 9 April, and UB-5 departed on her first patrol soon after. On 15 April, 6 nautical miles (11 km; 6.9 mi) from the North Hinder lightship, UB-5 scored her first success when she torpedoed and sank the British steamer Ptarmigan. The 784 GRT steamer was carrying a general cargo from Rotterdam to London when she went down with the loss of eight crewmen.

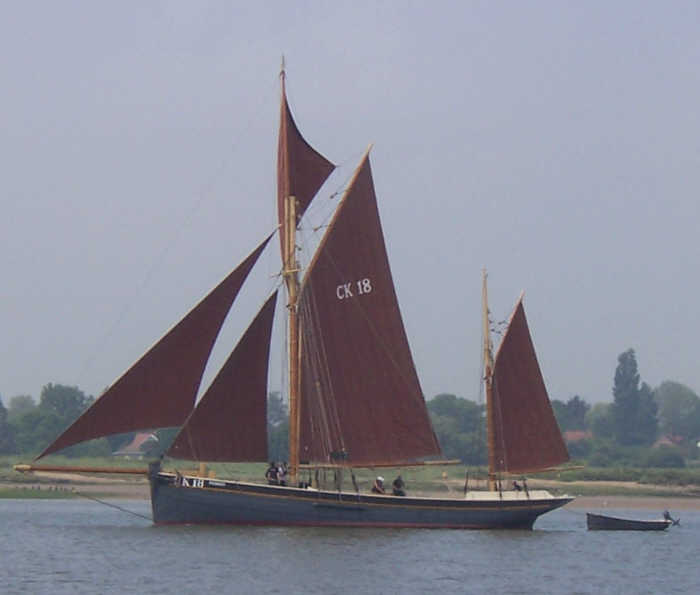
Four of UB-2's five victims were fishing smacks, traditionally outfitted with red ochre sails, like this contemporary smack.

After UB-5's sister boat UB-6 pioneered a route around past British anti-submarine nets and mines in the Straits of Dover in late June, boats of the flotilla began to patrol the western English Channel. UB-2, UB-5, and UB-10 soon followed with patrols in the Channel, but were hampered by fog and bad weather. Even though none of the boats sank any ships, by successfully completing their voyages they helped further prove the feasibility of defeating the British countermeasures in the Straits of Dover.

On 13 and 14 August, while patrolling in Lowestoft–Cromer area, UB-5 sank four British fishing smacks with a combined tonnage of just over 200 GRT, the largest being Sunflower and J.W.F.T., each of 60 gross register tons (GRT). All four of the smacks—sailing vessels traditionally rigged with red ochre sails—were stopped, boarded by crewmen from UB-5, and sunk with explosives. These were the last ships UB-5 sank during the war.

Germany's submarine offensive was suspended on 18 September by the chief of the Admiralstab, Admiral Henning von Holtzendorff, In response to American demands after the sinking of the Cunard Line steamer Lusitania in May 1915 and other high-profile sinkings in August and September. Holtzendorff's directive from ordered all U-boats out of the English Channel and the South-Western Approaches and required that all submarine activity in the North Sea be conducted strictly along prize regulations. Shortly after this cessation, UB-5 was transferred to the Baltic Flotilla (German: U-boote der Ostseetreitträfte V. U-Halbflotille) on 9 October.

Boats of the Baltic flotilla were based at either Kiel, Danzig, or Libau, but where UB-5 was stationed during this time is not reported in sources. On 21 September 1916, UB-5 was transferred to training duties. According to authors R.H. Gibson and Maurice Prendergast, submarines assigned to training duties were "war-worn craft" unfit for service. At the end of the war, the Allies required all German U-boats to be sailed to Harwich for surrender. UB-5 was one of eight U-boats deemed unseaworthy and allowed to remain in Germany. (Note: The other seven boats were U-1, U-2, U-4, U-17, and three fellow Type UB I boats, UB-2, UB-9, and UB-11.) UB-5 was broken up by Dräger at Lübeck in 1919.

== Summary of raiding history ==
Ships sunk or damaged by SM UB-5
Date	Name	Nationality	Tonnage (Note: Tonnages are in gross register tons)	Fate
15 April 1915	Ptarmigan	United Kingdom	784	Sunk
12 August 1915	Sunflower	United Kingdom	60	Sunk
13 August 1915	E.M.W.	United Kingdom	47	Sunk
13 August 1915	J.W.F.T.	United Kingdom	60	Sunk
14 August 1915	White City	United Kingdom	45	Sunk
Total:			996	

== Bibliography ==
- Bendert, Harald (2000). Die UB-Boote der Kaiserlichen Marine, 1914-1918. Einsätze, Erfolge, Schicksal (in German). Hamburg: Verlag E.S. Mittler & Sohn GmbH. ISBN 3-8132-0713-7.
- Gröner, Erich; Jung, Dieter; Maass, Martin (1991). U-boats and Mine Warfare Vessels. German Warships 1815–1945. Vol. 2. Translated by Thomas, Keith; Magowan, Rachel. London: Conway Maritime Press. ISBN 0-85177-593-4.
- Gardiner, Robert; Gray, Randal, eds. (1985). Conway's All the World's Fighting Ships 1906–1921. Annapolis, Maryland: Naval Institute Press. ISBN 978-0-87021-907-8. OCLC 12119866.
- Gibson, R. H.; Maurice Prendergast (2003) [1931]. The German Submarine War, 1914–1918. Annapolis, Maryland: Naval Institute Press. ISBN 9781591143147. OCLC 52924732.
- Karau, Mark D. (2003). Wielding the Dagger: the MarineKorps Flandern and the German War Effort, 1914–1918. Westport, Connecticut: Praeger. ISBN 978-0-313-32475-8. OCLC 51204317.
- Miller, David (2002). The Illustrated Directory of Submarines of the World. St. Paul, Minnesota: MBI Pub. Co. ISBN 978-0-7603-1345-9. OCLC 50208951.
- Tarrant, V. E. (1989). The U-Boat Offensive: 1914–1945. Annapolis, Maryland: Naval Institute Press. ISBN 978-0-87021-764-7. OCLC 20338385.
- Williamson, Gordon (2002). U-boats of the Kaiser's Navy. Oxford: Osprey. ISBN 978-1-84176-362-0. OCLC 48627495.
