= Friedrich Lützow =

German admiral (1881–1964)

- Born: 31 August 1881; Neuendorf near Potsdam
- Died: 1 November 1964 (aged 83); Celle
- Relatives: Günther Lützow (son)
- Military career
- Allegiance: German Empire; Weimar Republic; Nazi Germany
- Branch: Imperial German Navy; Reichsmarine; Kriegsmarine
- Service years: 1899–1931, 1936–45
- Rank: Vizeadmiral
- Units: SMS Nassau; SMS Charlotte; SMS Hamburg; SMS Zähringen
- Commands: U-2, U-4; SMS Hamburg
- Conflicts: World War I: Battle of Jutland; World War II
- Awards: House Order of Hohenzollern
- Other work: Instructor at the Turkish Naval Academy

Friedrich Lützow (31 August 1881 – 1 November 1964) was a German naval officer who served in the Kaiserliche Marine, the Reichsmarine and the Kriegsmarine, eventually reaching the rank of Vizeadmiral during World War II. He was also a writer on naval warfare.

Following the start of World War II in Europe on Friday, 1 September 1939, when German forces invaded Poland, Lützow was called back into military service on 24 December 1939. He served as head of the propaganda department of the Kriegsmarine. In this capacity, he was the speaker of the Oberkommando der Marine (Naval High Command). He regularly held Wednesday evening's radio broadcast lectures under the title "naval warfare and naval power," in which he explained the recent events of the war at sea.

== Career ==
Lützow joined the Imperial German Navy as a cadet on 10 April 1899 and was commissioned on 27 September 1902 while serving on SMS Weißenburg. His first posting was as adjutant on SMS Wettin. From 1905 till 1910 he served in different capacities on torpedo-boats simultaneously undergoing submarine training and finally taking over command of SM U-4 in 1909.

From 1910 till 1913 he served in several staff positions and attended two courses at the naval academy. At the outbreak of World War I, he was serving as the navigation officer on SMS Victoria Louise. In October 1914 he was appointed First Admiralty Staff Officer with the U-boat Command, a position he held until May 1918, when he took over command of I U-boat Flotilla in Pola. From March 1917 till May 1918 he was also in command of the light cruiser SMS Hamburg.

After the Armistice with Germany he returned to the staff of U-boat Command in December 1918, where he was charged with demobilization of the Mediterranean U-boat Command. From February till April 1919 he briefly served with the staff of North Sea Naval Station before joining the Reich Naval Office.

In 1924, after having served as Chief of Staff of North Sea Naval Station, since 1922, he took command of Hamburg again. In September 1925 he became commander of the North Sea Training Division (Schiffsstammdivision der Nordsee), a post he would hold for the next two years. His last position before retiring in 1929 was as director of the admiralty staff training course (Führergehilfenlehrgang).

After retirement he continued to work at Naval Command's printing department while still teaching on the admiralty staff training course until 1931. In 1936 he joined faculty of the Turkish Naval Academy in Istanbul where he taught for three years.

In 1939 he was reactivated and served as the official spokesman of the Naval Command until spring 1945. He was taken prisoner by British forces on 8 May 1945 and held in captivity until 1947. He died in 1964.

== Personal life ==
On 29. April 1908, Lützow married Hildegard Kinzel, the sister of Eberhard Kinzel. They had 5 children, including Günther Lützow (4 September 1912 – 24 April 1945), a Luftwaffe fighter ace who served in World War II.

== Awards ==
- Iron Cross (1914) 2nd and 1st Class
- Order of the Red Eagle 4th Class
- Knight's Cross 2nd Class of the Albert Order
- Knight's Cross of the House Order of Hohenzollern
- Hanseatic Cross of Hamburg
- Friedrich-August-Kreuz
