= Type U 3 submarine =

German pre-World War I submarine class

Class overview
- Builders: Kaiserliche Werft Danzig
- Operators: Imperial German Navy
- Preceded by: U-2
- Succeeded by: Type U 5
- Completed: 2
- Lost: 0

General characteristics
- Displacement: 421 t (414 long tons) surfaced; 510 t (500 long tons) submerged
- Length: 51.28 m (168 ft 3 in) (o/a); 45.00 m (147 ft 8 in) (pressure hull)
- Beam: 5.6 m (18 ft 4 in)
- Draught: 3.05 m (10 ft)
- Propulsion: 2 shafts; 2 × Körting 8-cylinder two stroke paraffin motors with 600 PS (440 kW; 590 shp); 2 × Siemens-Schuckert electric motors with 1,030 PS (760 kW; 1,020 shp)
- Speed: 11.8 knots (21.9 km/h; 13.6 mph) surfaced; 9.4 knots (17.4 km/h; 10.8 mph) submerged
- Range: 1,800 nmi (3,300 km; 2,100 mi) at 12 knots (22 km/h; 14 mph) surfaced; 50 nmi (93 km; 58 mi) at 5 knots (9.3 km/h; 5.8 mph)
- Complement: 3 officers, 19 men
- Armament: 4 × torpedo tubes (2 bow, 2 stern); 6 × 45 cm (18 in) torpedoes; 1 × 3.7 cm (1.5 in) Hotchkiss gun; From 1915 on U-3: 1 × 5 cm (2.0 in) SK L/40 gun

Type U 3 was a class of u-boats built by the Imperial German Navy in the years before World War I. The two Type U 3 boats were ordered on 13 August 1907 and built at Kaiserliche Werft Danzig and commissioned during 1909. They had more powerful engines than the previous U-2 and were far more reliable. Neither boat saw active service during World War I, with both being used as training boats.

== Design ==
Type U 3s had an overall length of 51.28 m (168 ft 3 in) The boats' beam was 5.60 m (18 ft 4 in), the draught was 3.05 m (10 ft 0 in). The boats displaced 421 tonnes (414 long tons) when surfaced and 510 t (500 long tons) when submerged.

Type U 3s were fitted with two Körting 8-cylinder two-stroke paraffin engines with a total of 600 metric horsepower (441 kW; 592 bhp) for use on the surface and two SSW double-acting electric motors with a total of 760 kW (1,033 PS; 1,019 shp) for underwater use. These engines powered two shafts, which gave the boats a top surface speed of 11.8 knots (21.9 km/h; 13.6 mph), and 9.4 knots (17.4 km/h; 10.8 mph) when submerged. Cruising range was 3,000 nautical miles (5,600 km; 3,500 mi) at 9 knots (17 km/h; 10 mph) on the surface and 50 nautical miles (93 km; 58 mi) at 4.5 knots (8.3 km/h; 5.2 mph) submerged. Constructional diving depth (Note: Constructional diving depth had a safety factor of 2.5, which meant that crushing depth was 2.5 times construction diving depth.) was 50 m (164 ft 1 in).

The boats were armed with four 45 cm (18 in) torpedo tubes, two fitted in the bow and two in the stern. They carried six C/06 torpedoes instead of the older C/03 torpedo. C/06 torpedoes were slightly larger than the preceding C/03, they had a more powerful propulsion unit and could be fired under an angle. The boats' complement was 3 officers and 19 enlisted. Until the end of 1914, the Type U 3 U-boats could be equipped with a rotating Hotchkiss gun, and after 1915 U-3 was occasionally equipped with an extra 5 cm SK L/40 gun.

== List of Type U 3 boats ==
Both boats in the class were part of the training u-boat flotilla during World War I and did not see active service. Both were surrendered after the Armistice of 11 November 1918.

Name	Launched	Commissioned	Notes
U-3	27 March 1909	29 May 1909	Sunk on 1 December 1918 whilst under tow to be broken up.
U-4	18 May 1909	1 July 1909	Broken up at Kiel in 1919.

== Bibliography ==
- Gröner, Erich; Jung, Dieter; Maass, Martin (1991). German Warships 1815–1945, U-boats and Mine Warfare Vessels. Vol. 2. Translated by Thomas, Keith; Magowan, Rachel. London: Conway Maritime Press. ISBN 0-85177-593-4.
- Herzog, Bodo (1993). Deutsche U-Boote : 1906 - 1966 [German U-boats : 1906 - 1966] (in German). Erlangen: Müller. ISBN 9783860700365.
- Möller, Eberhard; Brack, Werner (2004). The Encyclopedia of U-Boats. London: Chatham. ISBN 1-85367-623-3.
- Rössler, Eberhard (1981). The U-boat: The evolution and technical history of German submarines. London: Cassell & Co. ISBN 0-304-36120-8.
