= UB9 =

UB9 may refer to:

- UB9, a postcode district in the UB postcode area
- SM UB-9, World War I German submarine
