= UB11 =

UB11 may refer to:

- UB11, a postcode district in the UB postcode area
- SM UB-11, a World War I German submarine
