= UB5 =

UB5 may refer to:

- UB5, a postcode district in the UB postcode area
- SM UB-5, World War I German submarine
