= Autogen =

Autogen may refer to:

- AGA, a German car producer founded as Autogen-Gas-Akkumulator-AG
- Autogen, a programming framework for agentic AI
