= AGA (automobile) =

Automobile manufacturer

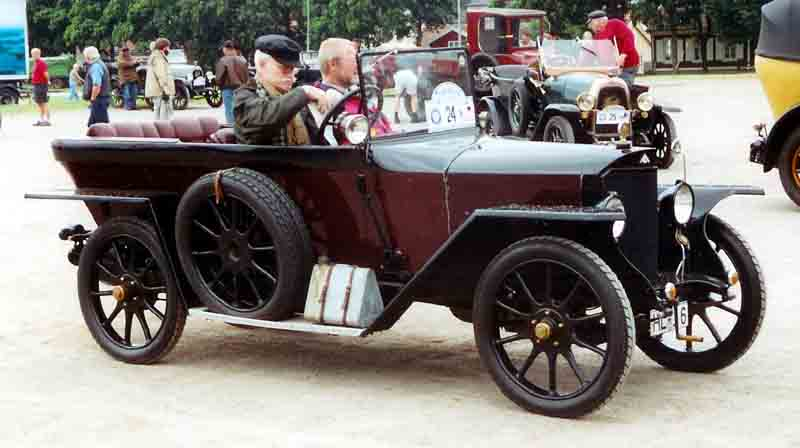
AGA 6/16 PS Typ A Phaeton 1921

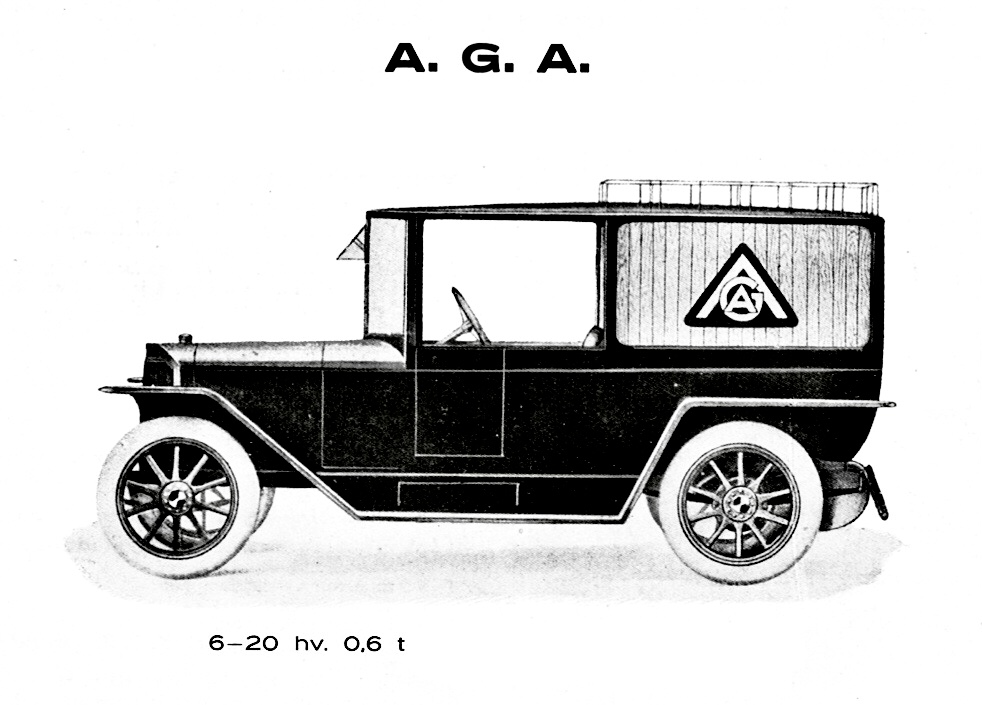
A.G.A Type E 6/20 HV (1921-1926) Delivery van

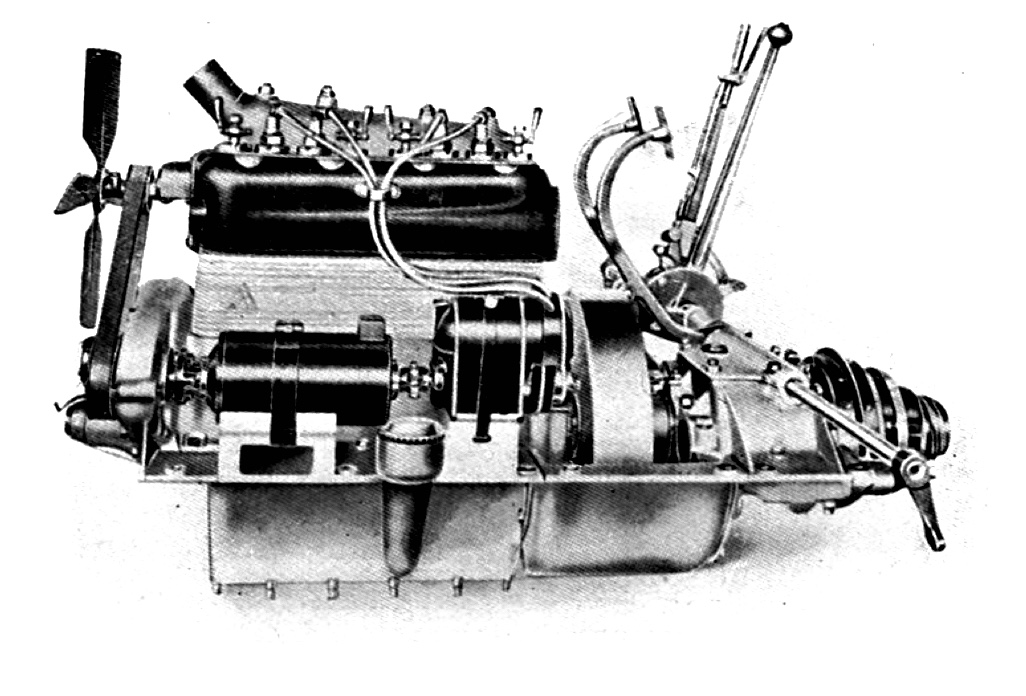
A.G.A. 6/20 HP Engine.

The Aktiengesellschaft für Automobilbau (= corporation for automotive engineering, abbreviation A.G.A. or AGA) was a German producer of cars in the 1920s in the German capital of Berlin (Prussia).

The company was founded as Autogen-Gas-Akkumulator-AG in Berlin in 1909 as the German subsidiary of the Swedish company Aktiebolaget Gasaccumulator, since 2000 a part of the German Linde group. During World War I the company produced parts for machine-guns, and had a new factory constructed on Herzbergstraße in the suburb of Lichtenberg. The company was rebranded as Aktiengesellschaft für Automobilbau in 1920, but AGA was refounded at the same time, so that both gas and automotive versions of the company existed simultaneously. In 1922 AGA became part of Stinnes-trust. AGA continued to be active after 1945 in West Berlin. Those data are based on the commercial register in the Berlin Landesarchiv.

The first car, the Typ A of 1919, had a 1418 cc four-cylinder engine driving the rear wheels through a three-speed manual transmission. The later Typ C followed in 1921 with the same configuration, and its engine gave a maximum of 20 PS (15 kW; 20 hp) as did the Typ A. The Typ C extended the wheelbase from 2,550 mm (100 in) to 2,780 mm (109 in), increased the engine's power output to 24 PS (18 kW; 24 hp), and even added brakes to all four wheels. Only very few cars of that kind were built. The A.G.A. Type C/ Type E in the delivery van version had a four-cylinder engine with 1415 cc, with a bore of 68 mm and a stroke of 110 mm, like the other vehicles. The gearbox had three gears. The maximum speed was 50 km/h. The wheelbase was 2550 mm and the track width was 1120 mm. The tires were sized 760 x 100. The vehicle already had a 12-volt system. The allowed payload was 600 kg. The fuel consumption was stated as 9 liters per 100 km. Never realized was a Typ D. This type had in the very beginning 16 PS (12 kW; 16 hp). The car was without much obvious technical ambition, but it was robust and inexpensive for its size, becoming popular especially with small business owners despite its dire brakes. In several cities, including Berlin and Breslau, it was for some time a popular car for use as a taxi.

After the death of Hugo Stinnes in 1924, AGA ran into cashflow difficulties, which ended in the company's bankruptcy at the end of 1925. Stinnes' son Edmund had been trying to implement a very expensive assembly line production at AGA, but never finished the project.

There were also plans for a small 850cc car to be built under licence from Singer Motors, and a 45 PS (33 kW; 44 hp) six-cylinder model, but these never reached the production stage. However, production from 1926 was severely curtailed, and ended in 1929. By that time between 8,000 and 12,000 AGA cars were produced.

AGA cars featured in a number of races, with notable Willy Loge as one of the drivers. For the 1924 Targa Florio AGA produced a small number of the TF 6/30 PS sports cars featuring a 1490cc engine. AGA won many races and was entered in the 1926 German Grand Prix. Other racers also drove AGA cars.

The Swedish company Thulin made around a hundred AGA cars under licence between 1920 and 1924.
