= Flanders U-boat flotilla =

German World War I Naval U-boat formation stationed on the Belgian coast

U-Boat Flotilla, Flanders
- Active: Raised March 1915, dissolved October 1918
- Country: Germany
- Branch: Imperial German Navy
- Type: U-boat flotilla
- Base: Bruges, Belgium
- Nickname: Flanders flotilla

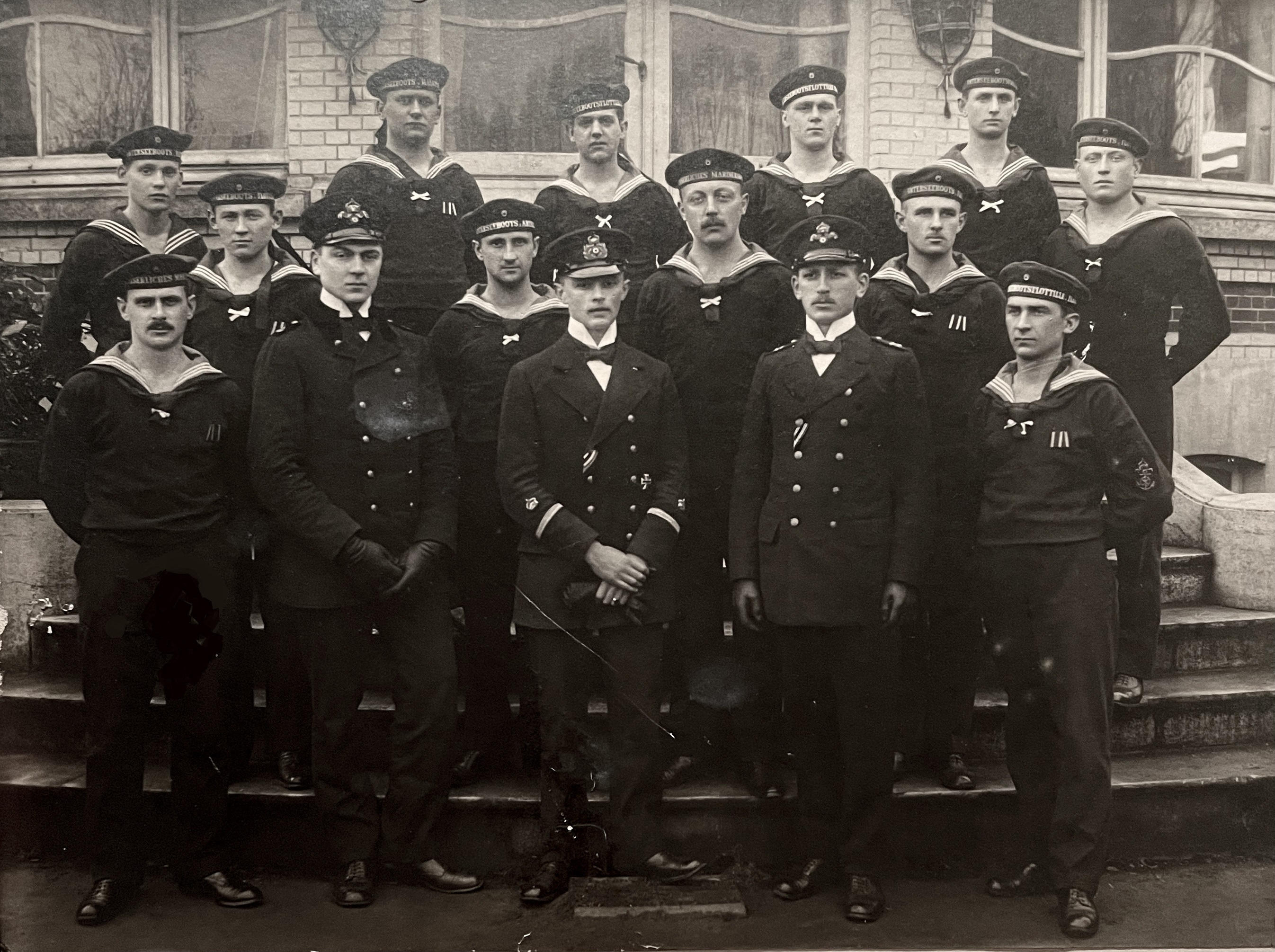

The Flanders U-boat flotilla (German: Unterseeboots Flotille Flandern) was an Imperial German Navy formation set up to prosecute the U-boat campaign against Allied shipping in the Channel and the North Sea (British Home Waters) during the First World War. The Flanders U-boat Flotilla was one of the naval components of the Naval Corps. Originally operating as a flotilla, it was split in two during the latter part of the war.

== History ==
On 18 August 1914, ten days after the start of World War I, the German Navy started to explore the idea of small, coastal submarines which could be built in a matter of a few months. On 11 September the idea was rejected but on 25 August as the German Army made rapid advances in Belgium and reached the coastline, the idea was put on the table again and the German Navy asked naval yards for design for a small U-boat which could be transported by rail. On 15 October fifteen Type UB I U-boats were ordered, with an expected construction time of four months only. Eventually only eight of the U-boats were transported in three parts to Hoboken, where they were assembled and subsequently transported on pontoons to the port of Bruges in occupied Belgium. A ninth boat, UB-2 reached Zeebrugge oversea, sailing from Kiel with a stop in Borkum. Based on the same Type UB I, the German Navy ordered on 23 November a further fifteen Type UC I coastal minelaying U-boats, of which eleven were transported in sections to Flanders.

The Flanders flotilla was constituted on 29 March 1915 in Bruges. The boats used Zeebrugge and Ostend as exit ports. Commanded by Kapitänleutnant Karl Bartenbach, the force comprised nine Type UB I U-boats at the end of April 1915. On 26 May 1915 the first Type UC I minelayer UC-11 arrived at Zeebrugge and nine more joined in 1915. By end September 1915 these UC boats executed 42 operations, laying 39 minefields which claimed 25 ships. Minelayers operated in the English Channel as far as Le Havre and Yarmouth, but their main activity was in Thames Estuary and The Downs. In 1916, a total of 953 mines were laid by the Flanders flotilla UC U-boats, which resulted in the sinking of 60 ships with a total tonnage of 82,379 GRT.

The first Type UB II U-boat, UB-18 arrived by sea in Zeebrugge on 16 February 1916, and three more followed in March. With these larger and more powerful boats, it was possible to operate further down the English Channel and in the North Sea until the Scottish coast. In March 1917 nine Type UB II U-boats were stationed in the flotilla.

Throughout the campaign the Flotilla grew, though losses also remained high, as the unit bore a considerable proportion of the trade war (Handelskrieg) around the British coast. During 1916 12 boats were lost; in 1917 this rose to 29 boats, 9 UB- and 20 UC-type.

In October 1917 the force was split into two full flotillas and Bartenbach, now a Korvettenkapitan, was made flotilla leader (Führer der U-boote, FdU). The 1st Flanders Flotilla, under K/L Walther, comprised 8 UB- and 12 UC- boats at its formation. during the next twelve months 10 UB- and 5 UC- boats were lost. With replacements the unit strength in 1918 was 16 UB- and 9 UC- boats. The 2nd Flanders Flotilla, led by K/L Rohrbeck, comprised 12 UB- and 12 UC- boats; 12 UB- and 4 UC- boats were lost but with replacements its strength in 1918 was 17 UB- and 7 UC- boats. Towards the end of 1918 the base at Bruges was abandoned as the German armies on the Western Front retreated. The surviving boats of the flotillas were surrendered at Harwich in November 1918.

The most successful U-boats from the Flanders Flottilla were UB-40 which made 28 sorties and sank 106 ships with a total of 160,000 GRT, and SM UC-21 which sank 93 ships with a total of 130,000 GRT.

== Strength ==
Number of available U-boats per month
Year	Jan	Feb	Mar	Apr	May	Jun	Jul	Aug	Sep	Okt	Nov	Dec
1915	-	-	-	-	7	10	13	15	15	16	13	14
1916	14	14	17	16	13	15	16	15	18	20	24	25
1917	22	33	38	35	35	33	37	35	37	35	36	34
1918	30	30	29	26	25	25	24	22	18	13	-	-
