= Type UB I submarine =

Small coastal submarines built in Germany

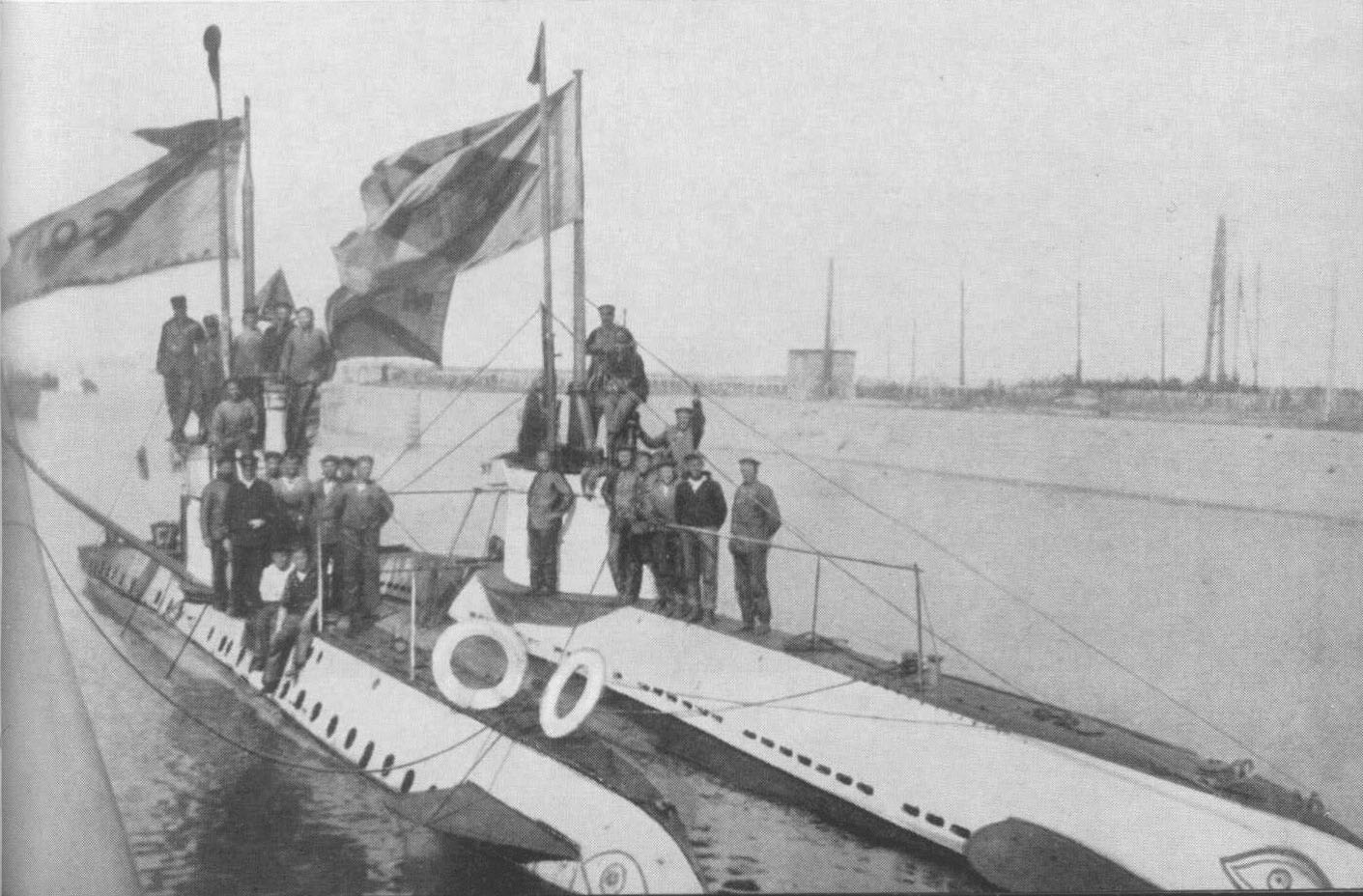
- SM UB-2 and SM UB-16 in Flanders.

Class overview
- Builders: Friedrich Krupp Germaniawerft, Kiel; AG Weser, Bremen
- Operators: German Imperial Navy; Austro-Hungarian Navy; Bulgarian Navy
- Preceded by: Type UA
- Succeeded by: Type UB II
- Built: 1914–1915
- In commission: 1915–1918
- Completed: 20
- Lost: 10
- Scrapped: 10

General characteristics
- Type: coastal submarine
- Displacement: surfaced: 127 t (125 long tons); submerged: UB-1 – UB-8: 142 t (140 long tons); UB-9 – UB-17: 141 t (139 long tons)
- Length: o/a: UB-1 – UB-8: 28.10 m (92 ft 2 in); UB-9 – UB-17: 27.81 m (91 ft 3 in); pressure hull: 23.62 m (77 ft 6 in)
- Beam: 3.15 m (10 ft 4 in)
- Height: 7.30 m (23 ft 11 in)
- Draught: 3.03 m (9 ft 11 in)
- Propulsion: 1 × shaft; UB-1 – UB-8: 1 × Daimler diesel engine, 60 PS (44 kW; 59 bhp); UB-9 – UB-17: 1 × Körting diesel engine, 60 PS (44 kW; 59 bhp); 1 × Siemens-Schuckert electric motor, 120 shp (90 kW)
- Speed: UB-1 – UB-8: 6.47 knots (11.98 km/h; 7.45 mph), surfaced; 5.51 knots (10.20 km/h; 6.34 mph), submerged; UB-9 – UB-17: 7.45 knots (13.80 km/h; 8.57 mph), surfaced; 6.24 knots (11.56 km/h; 7.18 mph), submerged
- Range: UB-1 – UB-8: 1,650 nmi (3,060 km; 1,900 mi) at 5 knots (9.3 km/h; 5.8 mph) surfaced; 45 nmi (83 km; 52 mi) at 4.5 knots (8.3 km/h; 5.2 mph) submerged; UB-9 – UB-17: 1,500 nmi (2,800 km; 1,700 mi) at 5 knots (9.3 km/h; 5.8 mph) surfaced; 45 nmi (83 km; 52 mi) at 4.5 knots (8.3 km/h; 5.2 mph) submerged
- Complement: 14
- Armament: 2 × 45 cm (17.7 in) torpedo tubes (bow, 2 × torpedoes); 1 × 8 mm (0.31 in) machine gun

The Type UB I submarine (sometimes known as the UB-1 class) was a class of small coastal submarines (U-boats) built in Germany at the beginning of the First World War. Twenty boats were constructed, most of which went into service with the German Imperial Navy (Kaiserliche Marine) Boats of this design were also operated by the Austro-Hungarian Navy (Kaiserliche und Königliche Kriegsmarine or K.u.K. Kriegsmarine) and the Bulgarian Navy. In the Austro-Hungarian Navy, it was called the U-10 class.

Built to meet the need for small maneuverable submarines able to operate in the narrow, shallow seas off Flanders, the vessels were intended to be quickly constructed, then shipped by rail and assembled at their port of operation. The design effort began in mid-August 1914 and by mid-October the first 15 boats were ordered from two German shipyards. The German Imperial Navy subsequently ordered an additional pair of boats to replace two sold to Austria-Hungary, who ordered a further three boats in April 1915 for a total of 20 UB Is built.

Construction of the first boats for Germany began in early November 1914; all 20 were completed by October 1915. Several of the first boats underwent trials in German home waters, but the rest were assembled and tested at either Antwerp or Pola. The German boats operated primarily in the Flanders, but also in the Baltic, Pola and Constantinople Flotillas. The boats were about 28 metres (92 ft) long and displaced 127 tonnes (125 long tons) when surfaced and 142 tonnes (140 long tons) while submerged. All had two bow torpedo tubes and two torpedoes, and were equipped with a deck-mounted machine gun.

In 1918 four of the surviving German boats were converted into coastal minelayers. Of the seventeen boats in German service, two were sold to Austria-Hungary, one was sold to Bulgaria, and nine were lost during the war. One of the five Austro-Hungarian boats was sunk and another mined and not repaired. The five surviving German boats, the four surviving Austro-Hungarian boats, and the Bulgarian boat were all turned over to the Allies after the end of the war and were broken up.

== Design ==
In the earliest stages of the First World War, the German Army's rapid advance along the North Sea coast found the German Imperial Navy without submarines suitable to operate in the narrow and shallow seas off Flanders. By 18 August 1914, two weeks after the German invasion of Belgium, the planning of a series of small coastal submarines had already begun.

The German Imperial Navy stipulated that the submarines must be transportable by rail, which imposed a maximum diameter of 3.15 metres (10 ft 4 in). The rushed planning effort—which had been assigned the name "Project 34"—resulted in the Type UB I design, created specifically for operation from Flanders. The boats were to be about 28 metres (92 ft) long and to displace about 125 tonnes (123 long tons) with two bow torpedo tubes.

=== Characteristics ===
On 15 October, eight Type UB I UB-1 – UB-8 were ordered from Germaniawerft Kiel and seven Type UB I UB-9 – UB-15 from AG Weser of Bremen. The Germaniawerft-built boats at 28.10 metres (92 ft 2 in) length overall, were 22 centimetres (8.7 in) longer than the AG Weser-built boats. All were 3.15 metres (10 ft 4 in) abeam, had a draft of 3.03 metres (9 ft 11 in), a height of 7.30 metres (23 ft 11 in) and a constructional diving depth (Note: Constructional diving depth had a safety factor of 2.5, which meant that crushing depth was 2.5 times construction diving depth.) of 50 metres (164 ft 1 in). The boats all had a pressure hull with a length of 23.62 metres (77 ft 6 in), displaced 127 tonnes (125 long tons) while surfaced, but while submerged UB-1 - UB-8 displaced 142 tonnes (140 long tons) whilst UB-9 - UB-17 displaced 141 tonnes (139 long tons). The former had an average diving time of twenty to thirty-three seconds, whilst the latter had an average diving time of twenty-two to thirty-three seconds.

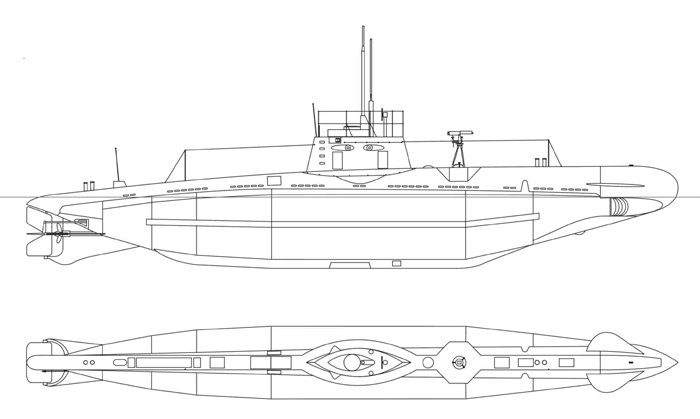
Technical drawing of the Type UB-I

The drivetrain of the boats consisted of a single propeller shaft driven by a four-cylinder, four-stroke RS164 Daimler (Germaniawerft) or Körting (Weser) 60 brake horsepower (45 kW) diesel engine on the surface, or a 90 kW (122 PS; 121 shp) Siemens-Schuckert electric motor for underwater travel. UB-1 - UB-8 had a top surface speed of 6.47 knots (11.98 km/h; 7.45 mph), and 5.50 kn (10.19 km/h; 6.33 mph) when submerged. Cruising range was 1,650 nautical miles (3,060 km; 1,900 mi) at 5 knots (9.3 km/h; 5.8 mph) on the surface and 45 nmi (83 km; 52 mi) at 4 kn (7.4 km/h; 4.6 mph) submerged. UB-9 - UB-17 boats were capable of 7.45 kn (13.80 km/h; 8.57 mph) on the surface and 6.24 kn (11.56 km/h; 7.18 mph) submerged. Cruising range was 1,500 nmi (2,800 km; 1,700 mi) at 5 kn (9.3 km/h; 5.8 mph) on the surface and 45 nmi (83 km; 52 mi) at 4 kn (7.4 km/h; 4.6 mph) submerged. The boats were equipped with two 45-centimetre (17.7 in) bow torpedo tubes and carried just two C/03 torpedoes. They were also armed with a single 8 mm (0.31 in) machine gun affixed to the deck. Type UB I U-boats had a complement of one officer and thirteen men.

The boats were equipped with compensating tanks designed to flood and offset the loss of the C/03 torpedo's 1,700-pound (770 kg) weight when these were fired, but this system did not always function properly; as a result, when firing from periscope depth the boat could broach after firing or, if too much weight was taken on, plunge to the depths.

=== Further development ===
Apart from the projected type UB I, the German Navy wanted also to deploy minelaying U-boats against England, from the same ports in Flanders. In order to speed up the design, the Type UB I was taken as a basis for the minelayer design. The forward half of the hull was modified to house six mineshafts instead of two torpedo tubes. Crew accommodation became even more cramped as there was no place anymore for bunks in the forward compartment. The first of these Type UC I U-boats were already ordered on 15 October 1914.

In the spring of 1915, it became clear that the war would continue well into 1916, and more coastal U-boats were ordered. The Type UB I had fulfilled the expectations but had some problems: it was underpowered and could often not cope with the strong currents present in the English Channel and before the Belgian and English coast. They did not have enough power to chase down steamers while surfaced and lacked the endurance to spend any extended amount of time underwater, exhausting their batteries after little over an hour's running. In-service use revealed another problem: with a single propeller shaft/engine combination, if either component failed, the U-boat was almost totally disabled. To address these problems, the next class of coastal U-boats, the Type UB II needed to be much larger and the Type UB I was not further developed.

As a stopgap measure, four Type UB I U-boats were converted into minelayers, by increasing the hull length to 32.0 metres (105 ft 0 in), and replacing the forward torpedo compartment with four mineshafts that could contain eight mines.

== Construction ==
The German Imperial Navy ordered its first fifteen Type UB I boats on 15 October 1914. Eight boats—numbered UB-1 to UB-8—were ordered from Germaniawerft of Kiel, and seven boats—numbered UB-9 to U-15—from AG Weser of Bremen. After two of the class, UB-1 and UB-15, were sold in February 1915 to ally Austria-Hungary (becoming U-10 and U-11 in the Austro-Hungarian Navy), the German Imperial Navy ordered UB-16 and UB-17 from Weser. A further three for Austria-Hungary —U-15, U-16, and U-17—had been ordered from Weser by April, bringing the total number constructed to 20.

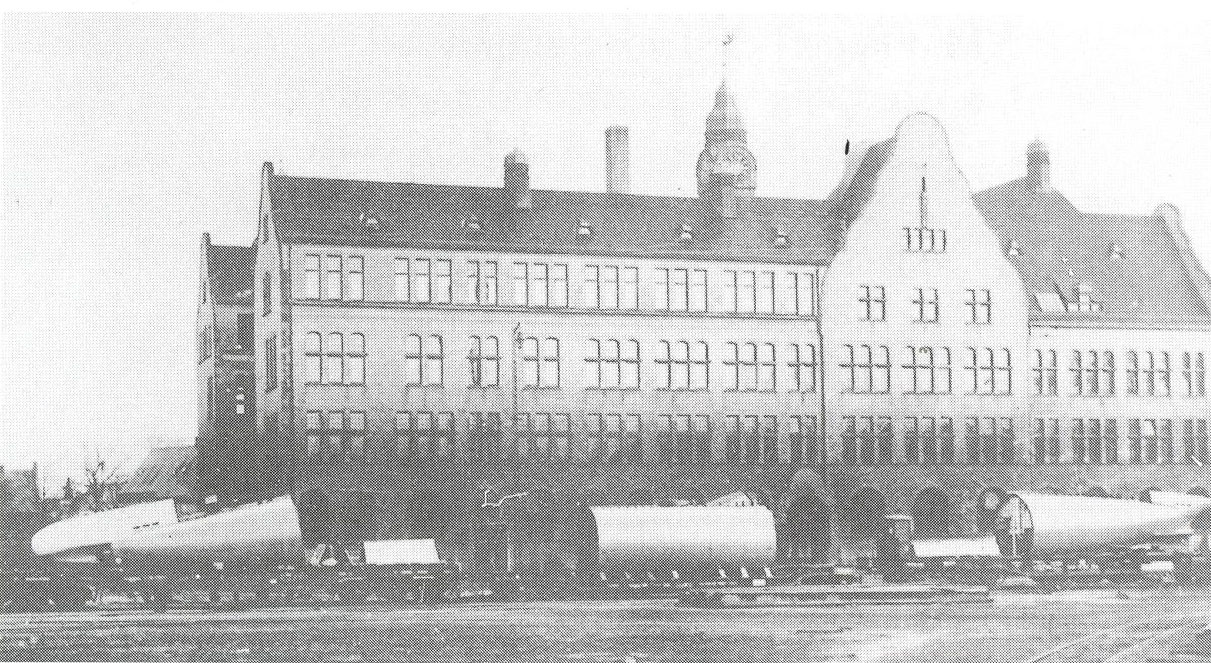
The three disassembled hull sections of UB-13 ready for transport over railroad.

UB-1 and UB-2 were laid down on 1 November 1914 at the Germaniawerft yard at Kiel. UB-1 was launched on 22 January 1915, just 75 working days later. UB-2's launch followed on 13 February. Among the Weser boats, UB-9 was laid down first, on 6 November 1914, and launched on 6 February 1915, a week ahead of UB-2. These first three boats launched underwent trials in home waters, but most of the other members of the class were shipped via rail and underwent trials at their assembly point.

The process of shipping the submarines by rail involved breaking the submarines down into what was essentially a knock down kit. Each boat was broken into approximately fifteen pieces and loaded onto eight railway flatcars. Type UB I boats destined for service with the Flanders Flotilla (U-boote des Marinekorps U-Flottille Flandern) made a five-day journey to Antwerp for the two- to three-week assembly process. After assembly at Antwerp the boats were towed by barge to Bruges for trials. Boats selected for service in the Mediterranean were sent to the Austro-Hungarian port of Pola for assembly. The total time from departure of the railcars from the shipyard to operational readiness for the boats was about six weeks.

By July 1915, all seventeen of the German Imperial Navy Type UB Is had been completed.

== History ==
The Type UB I were in active service from March 1915 through the end of the war, with half of the 20 boats lost during the war. Boats of the class served in three navies: the German Imperial Navy, the Austro-Hungarian Navy, and the Bulgarian Navy. In German service, they served primarily in the Flanders Flotilla, the Baltic Flotilla, and the Constantinople Flotilla.

Type UB I submarines built for the German Navy
Name	Date launched	Date commissioned	merchant ships sunk (nbr/GRT)	warships sunk (nbr/tons)	Fate
UB-1	22 January 1915	29 January 1915	none	1/120	Commissioned on 12 July 1915 in the Austro-Hungarian Navy as U-10. Handed over to Italy as a war reparation and scrapped at Pola by 1920.
UB-2	13 February 1915	20 February 1915	11/1.378	none	Broken up by Stinnes in 1920.
UB-3	5 March 1915	14 March 1915	none	none	Disappeared after 23 May 1915.
UB-4	March 1915	23 March 1915	3/10.883	none	Sunk by gunfire by HM Armed Smack Inverlyon, a British Q ship on 15 August 1915.
UB-5	March 1915	25 March 1915	5/996	none	Broken up by Dräger at Lübeck in 1919.
UB-6	March 1915	8 April 1915	16/7.007	1/480	Scuttled by her crew at Hellevoetsluis, Netherlands on 18 March 1917. Her wreck was later raised and broken up at Brest in July 1921.
UB-7	April 1915	6 May 1915	1/6.011	none	Disappeared after 27 September 1916.
UB-8	April 1915	23 April 1915	1/19.380	none	Commissioned on 26 May 1915 in the Bulgarian Navy as Podvodnik No. 18. Handed over to the French on 23 February 1919. Later towed to Bizerta, where she was scrapped after August 1921.
UB-9	6 February 1915	18 February 1915	none	none	Broken up by Dräger at Lübeck in 1919.
UB-10	20 February 1915	15 March 1915	36/22.583	1/1.072	Scuttled off Flanders on 5 October 1918.
UB-11	2 March 1915	4 March 1915	none	none	Broken up by Stinnes in 1920.
UB-12	2 March 1915	29 March 1915	22/10.234	none	Disappeared after 19 August 1918.
UB-13	8 March 1915	6 April 1915	11/17.674	none	Sunk after 23 April 1916.
UB-14	23 March 1915	25 March 1915	4/13.622	3/11.720	Scuttled off Sevastopol in the Black Sea in 1919.
UB-15	1915	4 April 1915	none	1/250	Commissioned on 18 June 1915 in the Austro-Hungarian Navy as U-11. Handed over to Italy as a war reparation and scrapped at Pola in 1920.
UB-16	26 April 1915	12 May 1915	25/18.825	1/1.075	Sunk by torpedo by HMS E34 on 10 May 1918 in the North Sea.
UB-17	21 April 1915	4 May 1915	13/2.274	none	Disappeared after 11 March 1918 off Flanders

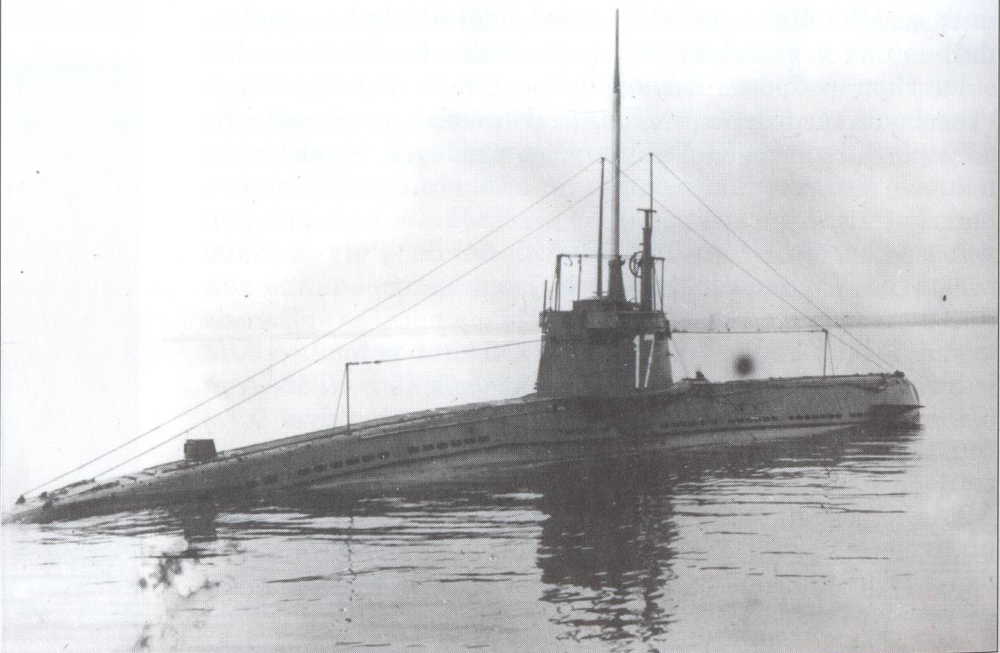
The Austro-Hungarian U-17 after its commissioning at Pola.

Type UB I submarines built for the Austro-Hungarian Navy
Name	Date commissioned	merchant ships sunk (nbr/GRT)	warships sunk (nbr/tons)	Fate
U-15	6 October 1915	5 / 8.044	1 / 720	Handed over to Italy as a war reparation and scrapped at Pola in 1920.
U-16	6 October 1915	2 / 87	1 / 325	Sunk on 17 October 1916.
U-17	6 October 1915	1 / 40	1 / 672	Handed over to Italy as a war reparation and scrapped at Pola in 1920.

=== German Imperial Navy ===
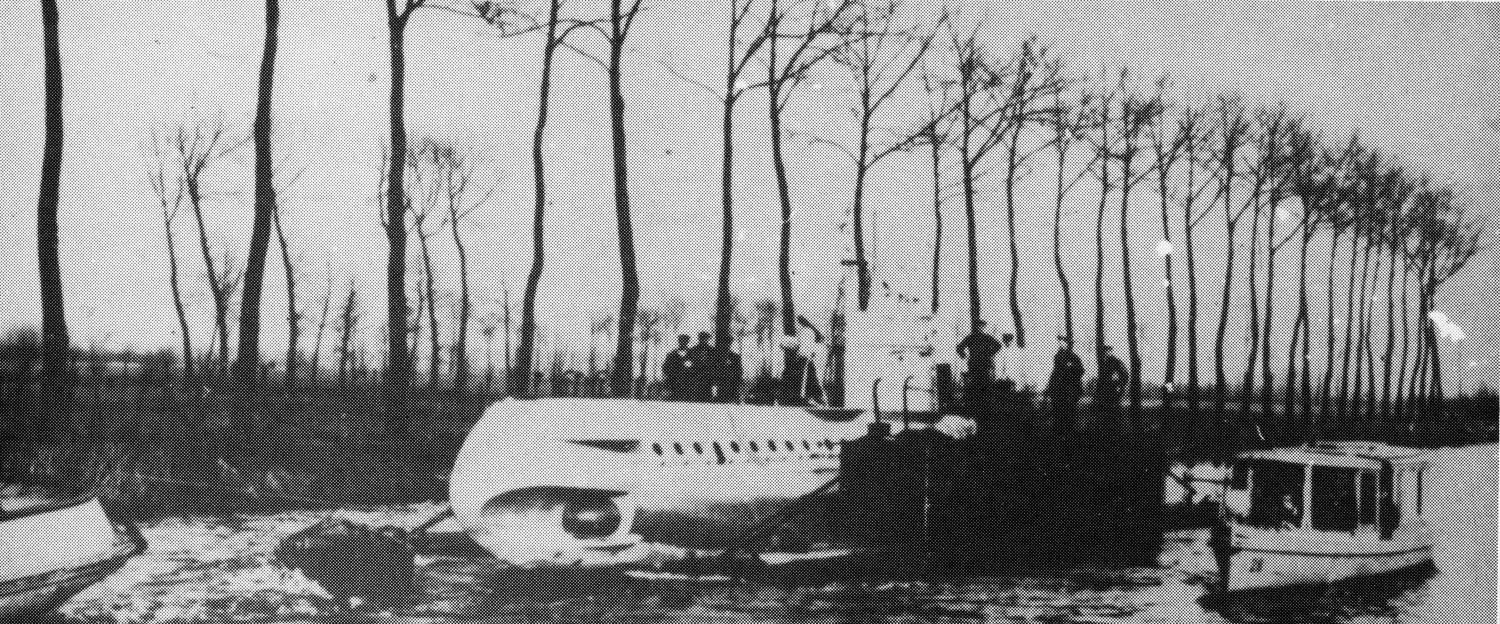
UB-6 is transported on a pontoon from Antwerp to Zeebrugge

==== Flanders Flotilla ====
The first Type UB I to enter service was UB-10, which formed the nucleus of the Flanders Flotilla, on 27 March 1915. By the end of April five more Type UB I boats had become operational. UB-10 was eventually joined in the Flanders Flotilla by UB-2, UB-4, UB-5, UB-6, UB-12, UB-13, UB-16, and UB-17; of these, only UB-2 made the journey to Flanders by sea rather than rail.

UB-4 departed on the first patrol from Flanders on 9 April, and was responsible for sinking the first ship sent down by the flotilla. The Type UB I boats of the Flanders Flotilla originally patrolled the area between the United Kingdom and the Netherlands, but began patrolling the English Channel after UB-6 pioneered a route past British antisubmarine nets and mines in the Straits of Dover in late June.

Over the Type UB Is' first year of service, UB-4 and UB-13 were both lost, and UB-2 and UB-5 were transferred to the Baltic Flotilla. In March 1917, UB-6 ran aground in Dutch waters and was interned for the rest of the war, along with her crew. (Note: UB-6 entered Dutch territorial waters due to a navigational error, and ran aground. Because the Netherlands was neutral during the war, and UB-6 did not leave Dutch territorial waters within 24 hours as required by international law, the submarine and her crew were interned by the Dutch. Germany protested, but because UB-6's grounding was the result of an error and not because of distress, the Dutch could not release the submarine.) The four remaining Type UB Is in Flanders—UB-10, UB-12, UB-16, UB-17—were all converted to minelayers by 1918, having their hull extended to 32 metres (105 ft). Their torpedo tubes were removed, and replaced with four 100-centimetre (39 in) mine tubes to carry eight mines. All but UB-10 were lost in 1918; UB-10, in poor repair and out of service, was scuttled in October 1918 when the Germans evacuated from Flanders.

==== Baltic Flotilla ====
UB-9 was initially assigned to the Baltic Flotilla,(U-boote der Ostseetreitkräfte V. U-Halbflottille) and was joined by UB-2 and UB-5 in early 1916. All three became training boats at Kiel in 1916, joining UB-11 in that duty. Little information is available about the Type UB I boats operating in the Baltic.

==== Constantinople Flotilla ====
Four of the German Imperial Navy boats—UB-3, UB-7, UB-8, and UB-14—were selected for service with the Constantinople Flotilla. (U-boote der Mittelmeer Division in Konstantinopel) All were sent to Pola for assembly and trials there as part of the Pola Flotilla(Deutsche U-Halbflottille Pola) before sailing on to join the Constantinople Flotilla. UB-3 disappeared en route to Constantinople in May 1915, but the other three arrived there by mid-June.

The three Type UB I boats of the Constantinople Flotilla seem to have patrolled primarily in the Black Sea. UB-8 was transferred to the Bulgarian Navy on 26 May 1916, and UB-7 disappeared in the Black Sea in October 1916, leaving UB-14 as the sole remaining German Type UB I in the flotilla; she was surrendered at Sevastopol in November 1918 to French armies stationed there during the Russian Civil War.

=== Austro-Hungarian Navy ===
UB-1 and the still incomplete UB-15 were sold to the Austria-Hungary in February 1915; both were dismantled and shipped to Pola in May. After one cruise under the German flag, each boat was commissioned into the Austro-Hungarian Navy. The pair—renamed U-10 and U-11, respectively—were joined by U-15, U-16, and U-17 in October. Known as the U-10 or the Okarina (Ocarina) class as a part of the Austro-Hungarian Navy, the five boats operated primarily in the Adriatic in patrols off Italy and Albania. U-10 (ex UB-1) hit a mine in July 1918 and was beached, but had not been repaired by the end of the war. U-16 was sunk after she torpedoed an Italian destroyer in October 1916, and the remaining three (and the unrepaired U-10) were ceded to Italy at the end of the war.

In addition, four Type UB Is (assigned to the Pola Flotilla based at the Austro-Hungarian Navy's main naval base at Pola were assigned Austro-Hungarian designations. (Note: After Italy had entered the First World War by declaring war on Austria-Hungary on 23 May 1915, Germany felt treaty-bound to support the Austro-Hungarians in attacks against Italian ships, even though Germany and Italy were not officially at war. As a result, German U-boats operating in Mediterranean were assigned Austro-Hungarian numbers and flags. After 28 August 1916, when Germany and Italy were officially at war, the practice continued, primarily to avoid charges of flag misuse. The practice was largely ended by 1 October 1916 except for a few large U-boats that continued using Austro-Hungarian numbers.) These were SM UB-3 (as U-9), SM UB-7 (as U-7), SM UB-8 (as U-8), SM UB-14 (as U-26). (Note: Sometimes cited as U-26 in the Austro-Hungarian Navy but she was never officially transferred to the Austro-Hungarian Navy from the German Imperial Navy.) These four boats remained under commission in the German Imperial Navy, retained German crews and commanders, and received orders from the German flotilla commander at Pola.

=== Bulgarian Navy ===
Germany and Bulgaria negotiated the purchase of two UB I boats for the Bulgarian Navy, UB-7 and UB-8, in 1916. Two crews of Bulgarian sailors were sent to Kiel for training. Before the purchase could be completed, UB-7 was sunk, leaving only one boat for Bulgaria. On 25 May 1916, UB-8 was officially transferred to Bulgaria for the remainder of the war and renamed Podvodnik No. 18 (in Cyrillic: Подводник No. 18). She was Bulgaria's first submarine, and was engaged primarily in coastal defense duties off Bulgaria's main Black Sea port of Varna. Podvodnik No. 18 survived the war and was ceded to France after the Treaty of Neuilly-sur-Seine.
