= SM U-4 (Germany) =

World War I German submarine

History

German Empire
- Name: U-4
- Ordered: 13 August 1907
- Builder: Kaiserliche Werft Danzig
- Cost: 1,629,000 Goldmark
- Yard number: 3
- Launched: 18 May 1909
- Commissioned: 1 July 1909
- Decommissioned: 27 January 1919
- Fate: Broken up in 1919

General characteristics
- Class & type: Type U 3 submarine
- Displacement: 421 t (414 long tons) surfaced; 510 t (500 long tons) submerged
- Length: 51.28 m (168 ft 3 in) (o/a); 45.00 m (147 ft 8 in) (pressure hull)
- Beam: 5.60 m (18 ft 4 in)
- Draught: 3.05 m (10 ft)
- Propulsion: 2 shafts; 2 × Körting 8-cylinder two stroke paraffin motors with 600 PS (440 kW; 590 shp); 2 × Siemens-Schuckert electric motors with 1,030 PS (760 kW; 1,020 shp); 550 rpm surfaced; 600 rpm submerged
- Speed: 11.8 knots (21.9 km/h; 13.6 mph) surfaced; 9.4 knots (17.4 km/h; 10.8 mph) submerged
- Range: 1,800 nmi (3,300 km; 2,100 mi) at 12 knots (22 km/h; 14 mph) surfaced; 50 nmi (93 km; 58 mi) at 4.5 knots (8.3 km/h; 5.2 mph) submerged
- Test depth: 30 m (98 ft 5 in)
- Boats & landing craft carried: 1 dinghy
- Complement: 3 officers, 19 men
- Armament: 4 × 45 cm (18 in) torpedo tubes (2 bow, 2 stern); 6 torpedoes; 1 × 5 cm (2.0 in) SK L/40 gun (from 1915)

Service record
- Part of: Training Flotilla; 1 August 1914 - 11 November 1918
- Commanders: Friedrich Lützow

SM U-4 was one of 329 submarines which served in the Imperial German Navy during World War I.

The boat was built at Kaiserliche Werft Danzig and commissioned on 1 July 1909. During the war she served as a training boat and did not see active service. After the war U-4 was partially broken up at Kiel in 1919, with her hull being sold on to Hugo Stinnes the following year.

== Bibliography ==
- Gröner, Erich; Jung, Dieter; Maass, Martin (1991). U-boats and Mine Warfare Vessels. German Warships 1815–1945. Vol. 2. Translated by Thomas, Keith; Magowan, Rachel. London: Conway Maritime Press. ISBN 0-85177-593-4.
- Rössler, Eberhard (1985). Die deutschen U-Boote und ihre Werften: U-Bootbau bis Ende des 1. Weltkriegs, Konstruktionen für das Ausland und die Jahre 1935–1945 [The German Submarines and Their Shipyards: Submarine Construction Until the End of the First World War] (in German). Vol. I. Koblenz: Bernard & Graefe. ISBN 3-7637-5213-7.
