= SM U-1 (Germany) =

German pre-World War I submarine

Coordinates: 48°7′48″N 11°35′00″E

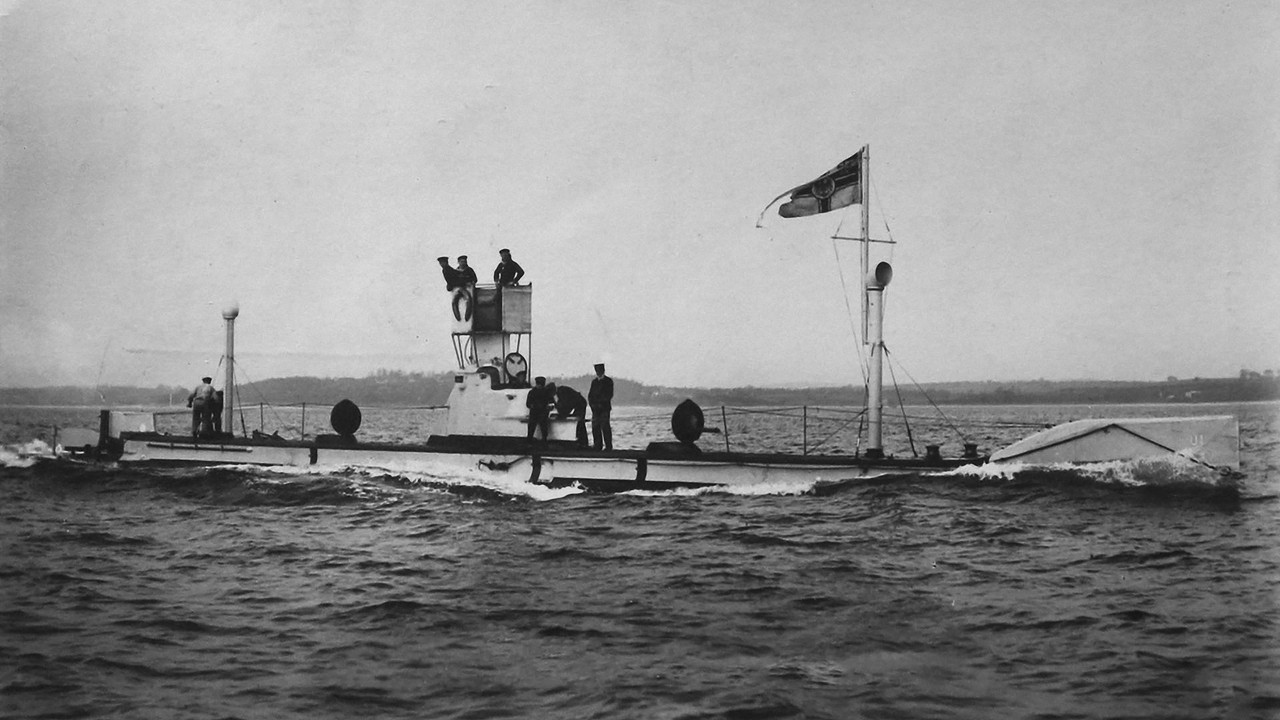
- SM U-1 at sea

Class overview
- Operators: Imperial German Navy
- Preceded by: None
- Succeeded by: U 2
- Completed: 1
- Preserved: 1

History

German Empire
- Name: U-1
- Ordered: 3 December 1904
- Builder: Germaniawerft, Kiel
- Cost: 1,905,000 Goldmark
- Yard number: 119
- Laid down: October 1905
- Launched: 4 August 1906
- Commissioned: 14 December 1906
- Decommissioned: 19 February 1919
- Fate: Sustained damage from collision in 1919, subsequently sold to Deutsches Museum
- Status: On display in the Deutsches Museum in Munich, Germany

General characteristics
- Class & type: Unique U-boat
- Displacement: 238 t (234 long tons) surfaced; 283 t (279 long tons) submerged
- Length: 42.39 m (139 ft 1 in) (o/a); 32.50 m (106 ft 8 in) (pressure hull)
- Beam: 3.75 m (12 ft 4 in)
- Draught: 3.17 m (10 ft 5 in)
- Installed power: 2 × Körting 6-cylinder two stroke kerosene motor with a total of 400 PS (294 kW; 395 shp); 2 × modyn by Deutsche Elektrizitäts-Werke Aachen with a total of 400 PS (294 kW; 395 shp)
- Propulsion: 2 shafts; 2 × 1.30 m (4 ft 3 in) propellers
- Speed: 10.8 knots (20.0 km/h; 12.4 mph) surfaced; 8.7 knots (16.1 km/h; 10.0 mph) submerged
- Range: 1,500 nmi (2,800 km; 1,700 mi) at 10 knots (19 km/h; 12 mph) surfaced; 50 nmi (93 km; 58 mi) at 5 knots (9.3 km/h; 5.8 mph)
- Test depth: 30 m (98 ft)
- Complement: 2 officers, 10 men (later 3/19)
- Armament: 1 × 45 cm (17.7 in) torpedo tube with 3 C/03 torpedoes

Service record
- Part of: Training Flotilla; 1 August 1914 – 11 November 1918

SM U-1 was the first U-boat produced for the Imperial German Navy. The boat was constructed by Germaniawerft in Kiel and was commissioned on 14 December 1906. The main purpose of U-1 was to develop operational experience with submarines and to test new equipment. When World War I began in 1914, U-1 was deemed obsolete and was used for training until 19 February 1919, when it was struck by another vessel while on an exercise. It is now on display at the Deutsches Museum in Munich.

== Design ==
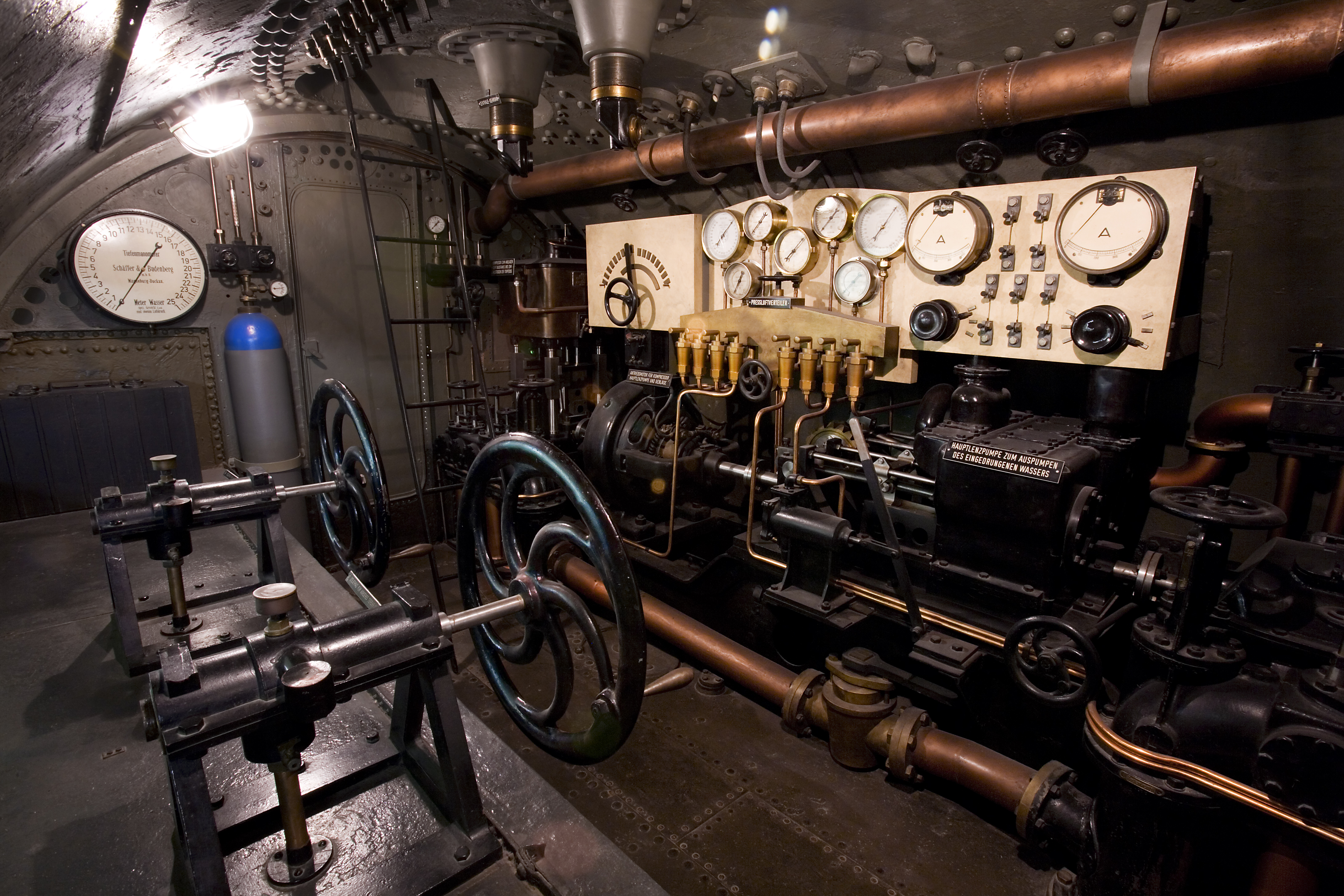
Center controls of U-1

At the beginning of the 20th century, when submarine development gathered pace, the commander of the Imperial German Navy Alfred von Tirpitz was reluctant to participate in it; instead he focussed on building the High Seas Fleet with which he intended to challenge the supremacy of the Royal Navy, and saw no role for submarines. Only when Krupp received an order for three Karp-class U-boats from Russia, did Tirpitz order a first submarine, the U-1.

The U-1 was a redesigned Karp class submarine by Austrian-born Spanish engineer Raimundo Lorenzo de Equevilley Montjustín working for the German shipbuilding company Friedrich Krupp Germaniawerft. The main improvements over the export Karp class included trim tanks instead of a moveable weight, a redesigned forecastle to improve seagoing ability, a 10 cm (3.9 in) larger diameter, a strengthened pressure hull, fuel tanks installed externally to avoid leakage through rivets, a rearrangement of the internal equipment, and a stronger ballast keel.

U-1 had a double hull. The inner pressure hull was 32.50 m (106 ft 8 in) long and was cylindrical with a maximum diameter of 2.80 m (9 ft 2 in), whereas the outer hull had an overall length of 42.39 m (139 ft 1 in), with a beam of 3.75 m (12 ft 4 in). The pressure hull was made of 12 mm (0.47 in) thick steel, with 1.60 m (5 ft 3 in) distance between frames. The outer hull was made of standard 3.5–4 mm (0.14–0.16 in) thick steel ( as used on torpedo boats ) with a zinc coating at both sides. U-1 had a draught of 3.17 m (10 ft 5 in), she displaced 238 tonnes (234 long tons) when surfaced and 283 t (279 long tons) when submerged.

The rudder was placed forward of the propeller. In order to minimize heeling during submerged manoeuvres, there was also a rudder mounted at deck level. These rudders were manually operated. Both the left and right forward hydroplanes were mounted on a common rudder spindle running through the pressure hull in a collar. Constructional diving depth (Note: Constructional diving depth had a safety factor of 2.5, which meant that crushing depth was 2.5 times construction diving depth.) was 30 m (98 ft 5 in).

U-1 was armed with one 45 cm (17.7 in) torpedo tube fitted in the bow and carried three C/03 torpedoes. The total cost amounted to 1,905,000 Mark (equivalent to €11,620,000 in 2016).

=== Propulsion ===
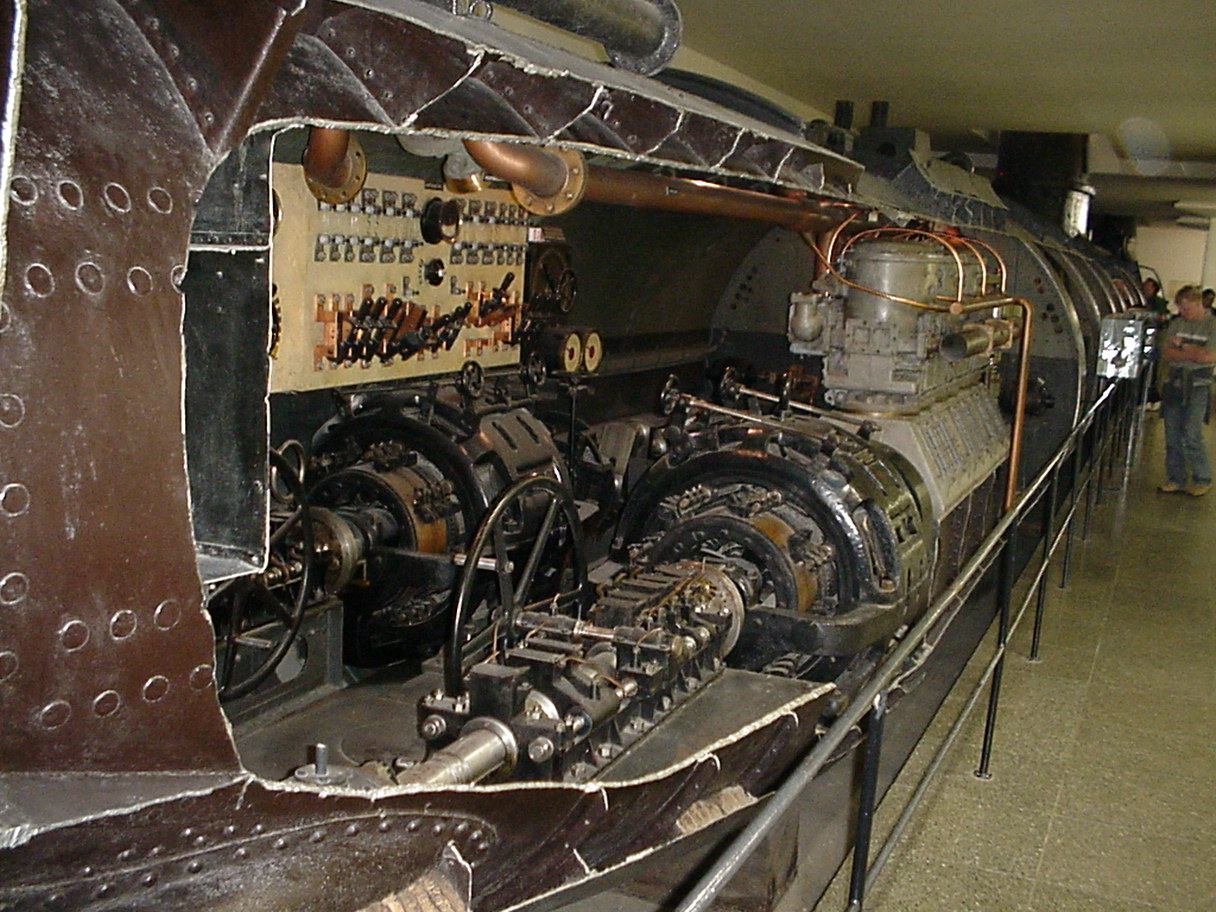
View on the electrical engines and kerosine engine of the U-1 at display in the Deutsches Museum in Munich

The Imperial German Navy avoided the use of gasoline due to the perceived risk of fires and explosions that had caused many accidents in early submarines, and instead of the gasoline engines that had powered the Karp boats, U-1 was given much safer Körting kerosene engines. While normally kerosene engines were started using gasoline, U-1's engines avoided even this and instead used electrically-heated air. The Körting engines could not be reversed, and could only run at full speed, since their rpm could not be varied to any useful extent, and as a consequence U-1 was fitted with variable-pitch propellers to allow her speed to be controlled. These were abandoned in subsequent designs due to their poor efficiency.

Although diesel propulsion had already been considered for the preceding Karp-class U-boats, the kerosene-electric propulsion continued to be used for U-1 and in the classes that followed. Diesel engines finally began to be used in 1912-1913 and were installed from the U-19 class onwards. U-1 was fitted with two Körting 6-cylinder two-stroke kerosene engines with a total of 400 metric horsepower (294 kW; 395 bhp) for use on the surface. These engines powered two shafts, which gave the boat a top surface speed of 10.8 knots (20.0 km/h; 12.4 mph) and a cruising range of 1,500 nautical miles (2,800 km; 1,700 mi) at 10 kn (19 km/h; 12 mph).

For submerged propulsion U-1 had two Garbe Lahmeyer double-acting electric motors with a total of 300 kW (408 PS; 402 shp). These engines were not designed for U-boats but were rather large sized land-based machinery. They were open and had no protection against dripping water or mechanical damage. The electrical engines gave the boat a top speed of 8.7 knots (16.1 km/h; 10.0 mph) when submerged, and a range of 50 nautical miles (93 km; 58 mi) at 5 kn (9.3 km/h; 5.8 mph). Power for the electrical engines was provided by a AFA lead-acid battery consisting of cells with mass plates and peat fibre insulation. One cell measured 55.5 cm (21.9 in) by 40 cm (15.7 in) by 25 cm (9.8 in) and could provide 715 Ampere-hour for ten hours. These heavy cells were stacked in layers, resulting in a too high center of gravity. This was compensated for by a 23 t (23 long tons) lead ballast in the keel. This type of battery cell was not successful because of problems with the insulation which overheated when the battery discharged at full capacity and uneven charging which reduced the life of the battery.

== History ==
U-1 was ordered on 3 December 1904 from Germaniawerft. She was commissioned on 14 December 1906, making Germany the last major European navy to adopt submarines. The boat was lifted into the water on 4 August 1906 and began its trials a year later than originally planned. The salvage ship Oberelbe lowered U-1 to a depth of 30 m (100 ft), first without crew and then, when the pressure hull was found to be safe, with a crew.

The U-boat was thoroughly tested in the calm waters of Eckernförde during the following year. Based on testing, some minor improvements were implemented. During the Kiel Naval Week of March 1907, the commander was decorated with the Order of the Red Eagle for hitting the light cruiser München, on which Kaiser Wilhelm II was embarked, with two exercise torpedoes. In August 1907, the boat proved its seaworthiness by sailing autonomously from Wilhelmshaven around Denmark to Kiel in very adverse weather. The original crew of twelve was expanded to twenty-two in order to cope with all the necessary duties.

U-1 was used for crew training and as a test boat and did not see active service during World War I. After suffering damage from a collision while on a training exercise in 1919, U-1 was sold to the Germaniawerft foundation at the Deutsches Museum in Munich where she was restored and can be viewed on display. A large portion of the starboard hull has been removed to allow visitors to see the submarine's interior.
