= SM U-2 (Germany) =

German pre-World War I submarine

Class overview
- Operators: Imperial German Navy
- Preceded by: U 1
- Succeeded by: Type U 3
- Completed: 1

History

German Empire
- Name: U–2
- Ordered: 4 March 1906
- Builder: Kaiserliche Werft Danzig
- Cost: 1,548,000 Goldmark
- Yard number: 1
- Launched: 18 June 1908
- Commissioned: 18 July 1908
- Decommissioned: 19 February 1919
- Fate: Sold to Stinnes 3 February 1920 for shipbreaking

General characteristics
- Class & type: Unique U-boat
- Displacement: 341 t (336 long tons) surfaced; 430 t (420 long tons) submerged
- Length: 45.42 m (149 ft) (o/a); 39.30 m (128 ft 11 in) (pressure hull)
- Beam: 5.50 m (18 ft 1 in)
- Draught: 3.05 m (10 ft)
- Installed power: 2 × Körting 6-cylinder two stroke kerosene motor with a total of 400 PS (294 kW; 395 shp) for surface use until 1910; 2 × Daimler 6-cylinder four stroke paraffin motors with 600 PS (440 kW; 590 shp) for surface use after 1910; 2 × SSW electric motors with 630 PS (460 kW; 620 shp) submerged
- Propulsion: 2 shafts; 2 × 1 m (3 ft 3 in) propellers
- Speed: 13.2 kn (24.4 km/h; 15.2 mph) surfaced; 9 knots (17 km/h; 10 mph) submerged
- Range: 1,600 nautical miles (3,000 km; 1,800 mi) at 13 knots (24 km/h; 15 mph) surfaced; 50 nautical miles (93 km; 58 mi) at 5 knots (9.3 km/h; 5.8 mph) submerged
- Test depth: 30 m (98 ft)
- Complement: 3 officers, 19 men
- Armament: 2 bow and 2 stern torpedo tubes; 6 45 cm (17.7 in) torpedoes

Service record
- Part of: Training Flotilla; 1 August 1914 - 11 November 1918
- Operations: none
- Victories: No ships sunk or damaged

SM U-2 was a German U-boat built for the Imperial German Navy. She was the second submarine to enter service in the German Navy and was a vast improvement over her predecessor U-1, although problems with her propulsion plant dogged her for the duration of her career. U-2 was only used for gathering experience with operating submarines and for crew training, she saw no active service during World War I.

== Design ==
As the German navy realized it was lagging behind in submarine development, U-2 was ordered from Kaiserliche Werft Danzig (KWD) on 4 March 1906, even before the previous U-boat U-1 had begun her trials. The KWD had no experience at all in building submarines, all U-boats so far had been built at the Germaniawerft. But the head of the submarine development department at the KWD, Raimundo Lorenzo de Equevilley Montjustín, the designer of the previous U-1, was a foreigner and the German Navy was reluctant to share the design of U-2 with him.

U-2 featured a lot of improvements over U-1: with a larger hull there was place for more powerful Daimler engines and the armament was increased from one 45 cm (17.7 in) bow torpedo tube to two bow and two stern 45 cm torpedo tubes, armed with six C/03 torpedoes. Apart from the two periscopes in the conning tower, a third periscope was installed in the control room. the control room was now placed beneath the conning tower. The speed of the U-boat was not controlled anymore by variable-pitch propellers but by the electrical engine which was split into three parts, one mounted after and the other two together before the kerosine engine, on the same shaft. Only when cruising the kerosine engines were directly coupled with the shafts. When manoeuvring, the kerosine engines were driving the double electrical engines. The peat isolated batteries of U-1 were replaced with a new type of large surface batteries. On U-1 the external diving tanks were not large enough so that some of the internal trim and compensating tanks had to be used as diving tanks, but on U-2 all diving tanks were external.

The inexperience with submarine construction led to many delays, but the main reason for taking nearly two years before her launching on 18 June 1908, was the failure of the planned surface propulsion plant. The Daimler engines were not available and reliable before 1910 and finally the same, less powerful, Körting engines as on U-1 were installed, which reduced surface speed to 10.5 knots (19.4 km/h; 12.1 mph).

== Characteristics ==
U-2 had a double hull, the inner pressure hull was 39.30 m (128 ft 11 in) long and was cylindrical with a maximum diameter of 3.40 m (11 ft 2 in). The outer hull had an overall length of 45.42 m (149 ft 0 in), with a beam of 5.50 m (18 ft 1 in) (o/a). The pressure hull was made of 12 mm (0.47 in) thick steel, with 1.00 m (3 ft 3 in) distance between frames. The outer hull was made of standard 3.5–4 mm (0.14–0.16 in) thick steel ( as used on torpedo boats ) with a zinc coating at both sides. U-2 had a draught of 3.05 m (10 ft 0 in), she displaced 341 tonnes (336 long tons) when surfaced and 430 t (420 long tons) when submerged.

U-2 was refitted in June 1910 with two Daimler 6-cylinder two-stroke kerosene engines with a total of 600 metric horsepower (441 kW; 592 bhp) for use on the surface and two SSW double-acting electric motors with a total of 460 kW (625 PS; 617 shp) for underwater use. Each electrical engine consisted of three components: two six-pole SGM 310/25 of 170 kW (231 PS; 228 shp) at 900 rpm each wihich were mounted before the diesel engine, and an eight-pole SGM 330/34 propeller motor which produced 228 kW (310 PS; 306 shp) at 685 rpm which was mounted after the diesel engine. These engines powered two shafts, which gave the boat a top surface speed of 13.2 knots (24.4 km/h; 15.2 mph), and 9 knots (17 km/h; 10 mph) when submerged. Cruising range was 1,600 nautical miles (3,000 km; 1,800 mi) at 13 kn (24 km/h; 15 mph) on the surface, and 50 nautical miles (93 km; 58 mi) at 5 kn (9.3 km/h; 5.8 mph) submerged. Constructional diving depth (Note: Constructional diving depth had a safety factor of 2.5, which meant that crushing depth was 2.5 times construction diving depth.) was 30 m (98 ft 5 in). Her crew numbered three officers and nineteen enlisted men.

== Service ==
U-2 was launched on 18 June 1908, and commissioned into the Imperial German Navy on 18 July 1908. The U-boat undertook some trials and in the beginning of 1909 had her engine room modified in anticipation of the daimler engines, but once again delivery of these engines was delayed. U-2 remained in the shipyard until June 1910 when the Daimler engines were finally installed. Even then problems with the propulsion were not solved as difficulties with the dynamos rendered the submarine non-operational.

At the beginning of World War I, she was still in refit. During the war, she conducted no war patrols and was used as a training platform. After Germany's surrender, she was decommissioned on 19 February 1919 and sold for shipbreaking to Stinnes on 3 February 1920.
