= Hugo Stinnes Schiffahrt =

German logistics company

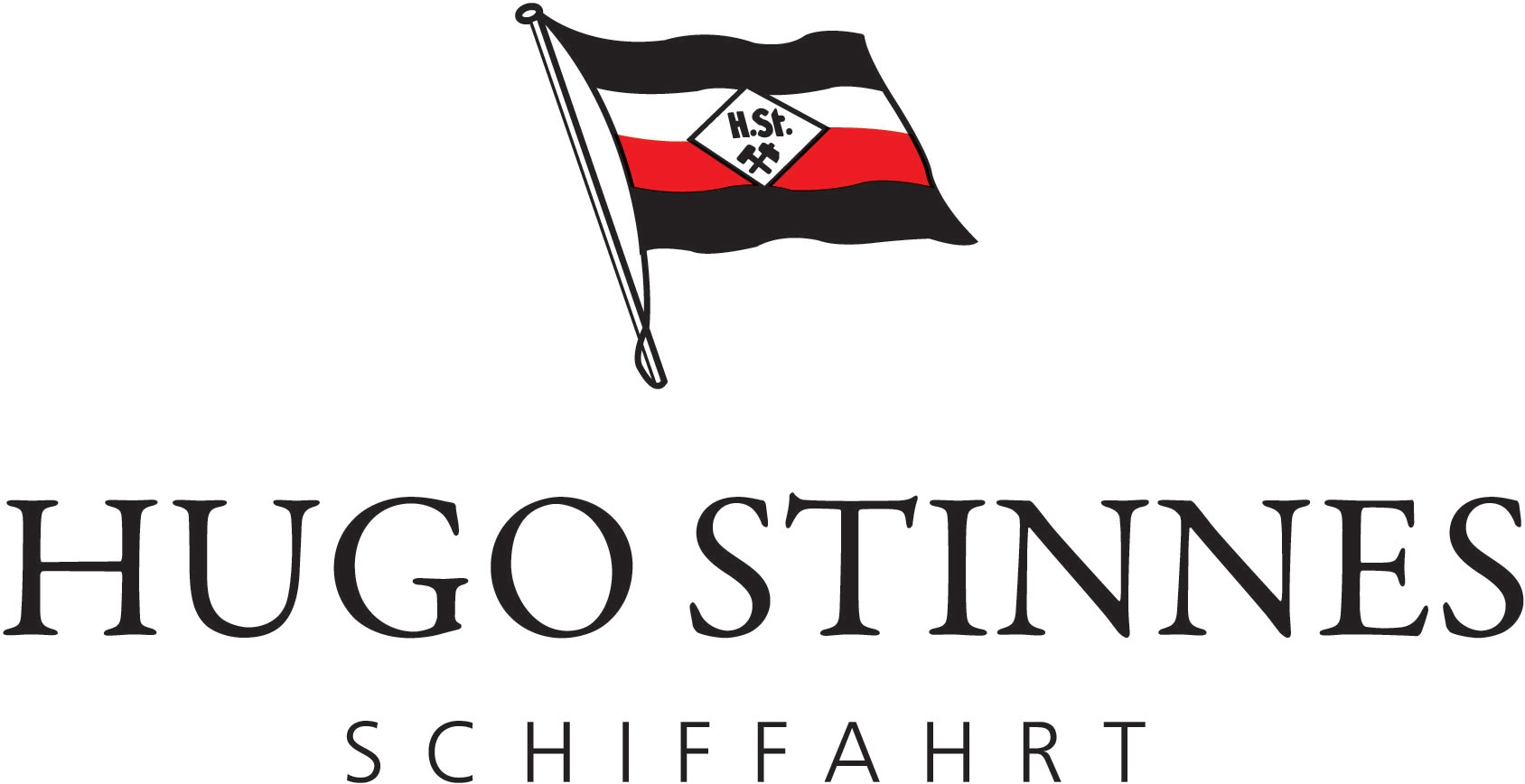
- Company type: GmbH (Limited Liability Company)
- Industry: sea and coastal freight water transport (NACE 50.2) water transport
- Founded: 1920
- Founder: Hugo Stinnes
- Headquarters: Rostock, Germany
- Key people: Mr. Jens Kroczek
- Products: Shipping
- Number of employees: 15
- Website: http://www.stinnes-linien.de

Hugo Stinnes Schiffahrt GmbH is a shipping company based in Rostock, Germany which specializes in container service between Germany and South Africa, and in transporting cargo between Northern Europe, the Caribbean and Mexico. It was part of the former conglomerate Hugo Stinnes GmbH.

== History ==
=== Hugo Stinnes GmbH and the Ozean-Linie ===
In 1808, Mathias Stinnes founded a company for shipping and coal trading, the activities focused on the rivers Rhine and Ruhr. Mathias Stinnes’ grandson Hugo Stinnes founded the company “Hugo Stinnes GmbH” in 1907 with the purpose of coastal coal trade, marine cargo handling and shipping. In 1917, Hugo Stinnes founded the Stock Corporation for Maritime Shipping and Overseas Trade in Hamburg, containing among others the companies of Mathias Stinnes and Hugo Stinnes. Ever since, this company has been the corporate center for all of Stinnes’ interests in shipping and overseas trade. After a failed attempt to gain influence in the established shipping companies by the acquisition of shares, Hugo Stinnes entered in 1920 into direct competition with the three main shipping companies HAPAG, Norddeutscher Lloyd and Hamburg Sued. In 1921, Stinnes took a share in the Ozean-Linie, founded in 1908 by the H. Schuldt group of shipping companies. The Ozean-Linie operated a liner service between the Continent and Cuba/Mexico. Until the death of Hugo Stinnes in 1924, more than 30 ships sailed - in co-operation with smaller shipping companies - under Stinnes' flag mainly to Central- and South America and to East Asia.

=== Hugo Stinnes Corporation ===
The Hugo Stinnes Corporation was founded in 1926 in order to raise American capital. Most of the Stinnes family’s considerable assets were ceded to this company. In 1941, the Stinnes family’s share in the Hugo Stinnes Corporation was considered enemy capital and confiscated by the U.S.A. The Hugo Stinnes Corporation was auctioned and continued business in New York under the name of Hugo Stinnes Industries Inc. Kept out of Hugo Stinnes Industries due to American restrictions, the Stinnes family got into business for themselves in 1948. In 1950, Cläre Stinnes, widow of the founder Hugo Stinnes, and the sons Hugo and Otto Stinnes founded the “Hugo Stinnes Fuel,- Iron- and Shipping Company, branch office Duisburg-Ruhrort”. Soon, Otto Stinnes relocated to Hamburg and assumed the management of the Stinnes fleet under the company name Hugo Stinnes, branch office in Hamburg.

=== Hugo Stinnes Schiffahrt GmbH ===
In 1989, the Iron Curtain fell and the GDR (East Germany) collapsed. East and West Germany re-united (October 1990). The Volkseigene Betriebe ("People-owned enterprises") were privatized.

In 1992, KG Monsun (a fully owned subsidiary of Hugo Stinnes, branch office Hamburg) and 'Deutsche Seereederei Rostock GmbH' founded the shipping company “DSR Stinnes West Indies Services GmbH”, domiciled in Hamburg. The company name was changed into “H. Stinnes Linien GmbH” in 1998. Deutsche Seereederei acquired the remaining shares from the Stinnes family in 2002 and moved the company’s headquarters from Hamburg to Rostock. By means of a buy-out, Deutsche Seereederei sold the activities of “Hugo Stinnes Linien GmbH” in 2008 to “Stinnes Holding GmbH”, a company founded by Mr. Jens Kroczek. This company continues its shipping activities to date under the name “Hugo Stinnes Schiffahrt GmbH”. Although no longer in possession of the Stinnes family since more than a decade, “Hugo Stinnes Schiffahrt GmbH” is nowadays the only company bearing the name Stinnes and operating in one of the three original fields of activity of the Stinnes conglomerate (coal mining, metallurgical industry, shipping). Besides operating a full container service from and to South Africa, the Rostock domiciled “Hugo Stinnes Schiffahrt GmbH” is a specialist for the ocean transport of breakbulk-, heavy load- and project cargo between Northern Europe, the Caribbean and Mexico, thus continuing the tradition of Ozean-Linie from 1921.
