= Körting Hannover =

German engineering company

Körting Hannover AG
- Formerly: Körting Brothers AG
- Type: Aktiengesellschaft
- Industry: Industrial engineering
- Founded: November 1, 1871; 154 years ago
- Founders: Berthold and Ernst Körting
- Headquarters: Hanover, Germany
- Key people: Dr.-Ing. York Fusch (Chairman of the board)
- Products: Engines
- Number of employees: ≈340
- Website: koerting.de

Körting Hannover AG (previously Körting Brothers AG) is a long-standing industrial engineering company in Hanover.

At the end of the 19th and beginning of the 20th century, the company played a leading role in the development of steam injectors in Germany and Europe.

Körting still produces pump and pump-based vacuum technology, but also industrial burners and machinery related to thermal and chemical purification/transformation processes.

== History ==
The Körting Brothers company was founded in Hanover on 1 November 1871 by the brothers Berthold and Ernst Körting. The brothers rented a small office and small space in the backyard of the present day 13 Joachimstrasse near Hanover Central Station. Berthold took charge of the commercial side, while Ernst specialized in the technical side. The brothers started successfully with the development and patenting of one of the first functioning injectors. In the beginning, only two workmen were employed.

Due to the ever-increasing orders, in 1872 the company rented a factory on Celler street in what is now the Oststadt district. It consisted of two small buildings with a 12 horse-power steam engine. It would employ 41 workers. The young enterprise produced injectors and jet-pumps as well as the associated condensers. In 1874 the small factory was already supplying 2,000 devices.

The enterprise grew quickly, and in a few years established proxies in Germany and neighboring European lands (London, Paris, Milan, Genoa, Barcelona, Breslau (Wrocław), St. Petersburg, Vienna) and overseas (Philadelphia). The first foreign branch came into being as "Körthing Brothers" in Manchester. The American branch was opened in 1874. In 1880 the company had 20 staff and 170 workers. The product line was expanded to central heaters, gas scrubbers, gas-, gasoline-, and Diesel-motors. Körting vacuum brakes could be found in many trains of the time. In 1920, Körting also built the first Holzwarth gas turbine.

In 1889, a new, larger factory with a large foundry and a powerhouse, would be erected in Linden, where the firm's headquarters has been to this day. A workers’ town with a school was built in the direct vicinity, the so-called "Körtingsdorf". At its peak before the Great Depression, Körting employed approximately 1,700 workers and 400 staff. The company was one of the biggest employers in the Hanover region.

In 1904, the Fusch family entered the company through marriage. Today the Körting company is in the fifth generation of Körting/Fusch family ownership.

The product line was continually adjusted throughout the 20th century, whereby the core competence – flow devices (ejector pumps, nozzles, and industrial burners) – became ever more sophisticated. In contrast, the motor- and turbine-engineering declined and were ultimately abandoned.

== The Körting Double-Acting Gas Engine ==
In 1900 Ernst Körting filed patents for a novel design of gas engine. This engine had a single water cooled piston that was double acting, i.e. the cylinder had combustion chambers at either end. As the engine was a 2-stroke this gave it continuous power strokes, much as a double acting steam engine. The lack of continuous power strokes in internal combustion engines was perceived by those used to steam as having the potential for mechanical problems due to the intermittent power strokes. The Körting design was quite successful in a range of applications particularly large installations powered by blast furnace gas.

The prototype 350bhp engine was tested in June 1900 and the results presented in the 1900 annual meeting of the "Verein von Gas-und Wassefach Männern". published by the German Gas Lighting Journal, and reproduced in The Engineer. This article states that a four-stroke version of the double acting design was introduced two years before which also had both piston and rod cooled by water.

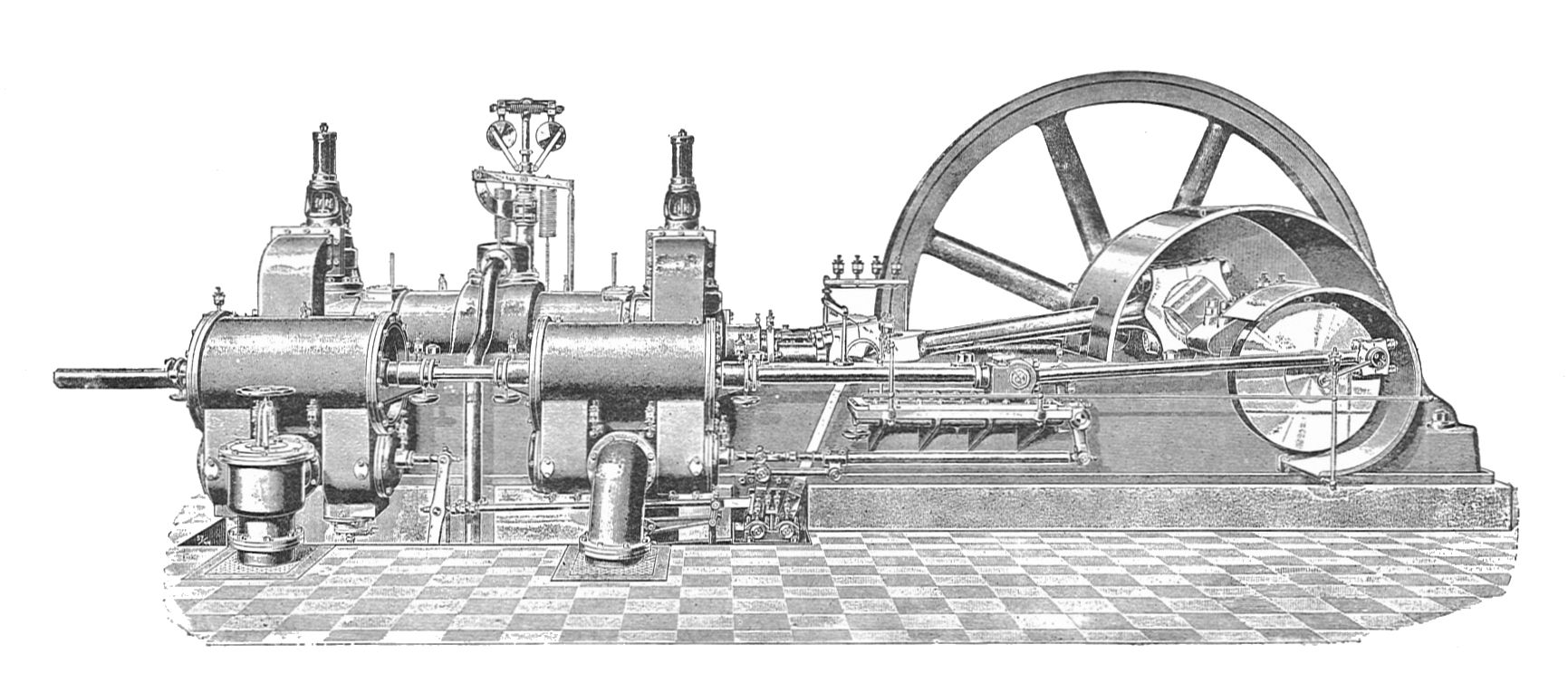
Körting gas engine of around 1900

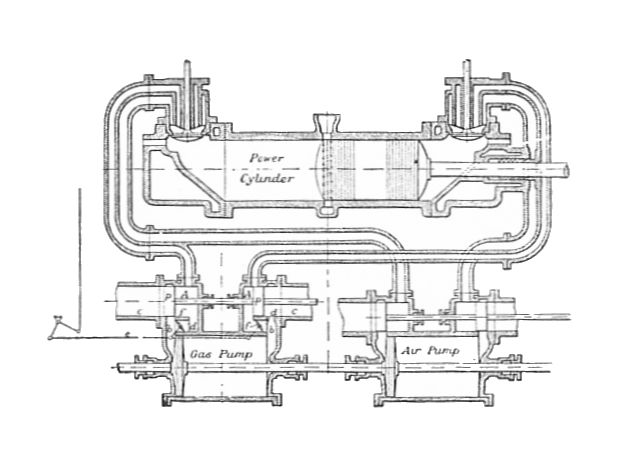
Körting gas engine of around 1900

== Other Körting Engines ==
Although Körting were known for their unusual double acting two-stroke, they made a range of more conventional engines over a long period. The 1909 Gross-Basenach experimental M III airship was equipped with two Körting V8 engines.

Körting engines (initially paraffin engines and later diesel engines) were used extensively in early German submarines. The 6 cylinder 2-stroke submarine engine was reviewed in The Engineer magazine in August 1906. This utilised crankcase compression, with the piston controlling all the ports. It was referred to as using petroleum, though this was almost certainly the less volatile paraffin/kerosene type, as it had exhaust heaters for the carburetors, and electric pre-heating of both cylinders and vaporisers, with the engine being turned over for some time by electrical power before being put to work. This allowing the engine to be started after 5 minutes. The engine was rated at 200bhp at 500rpm, and two were installed per submarine.

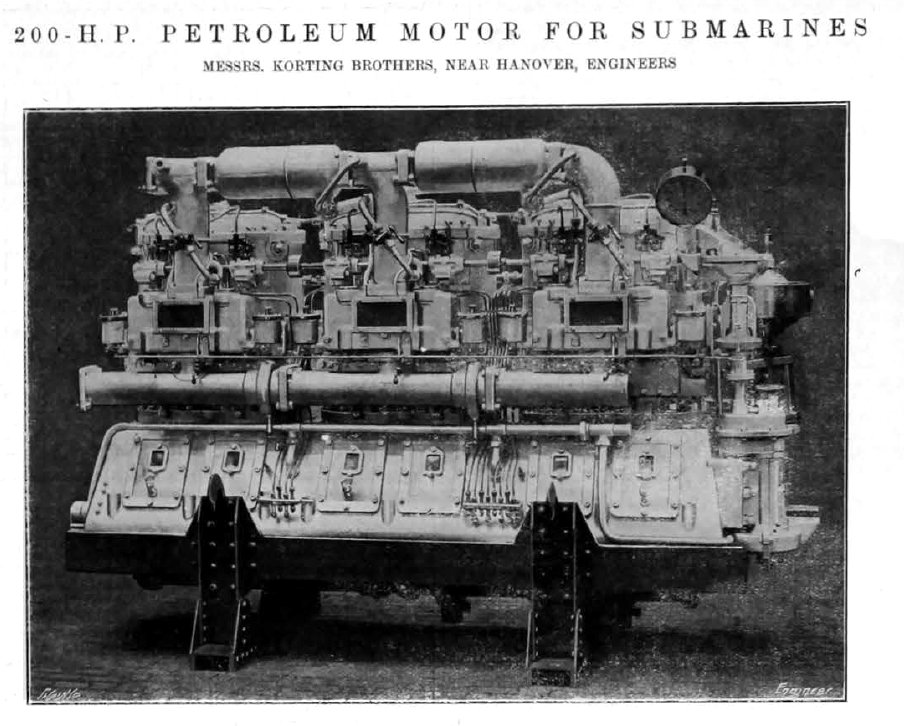
Körting straight 6 submarine engine - 1906

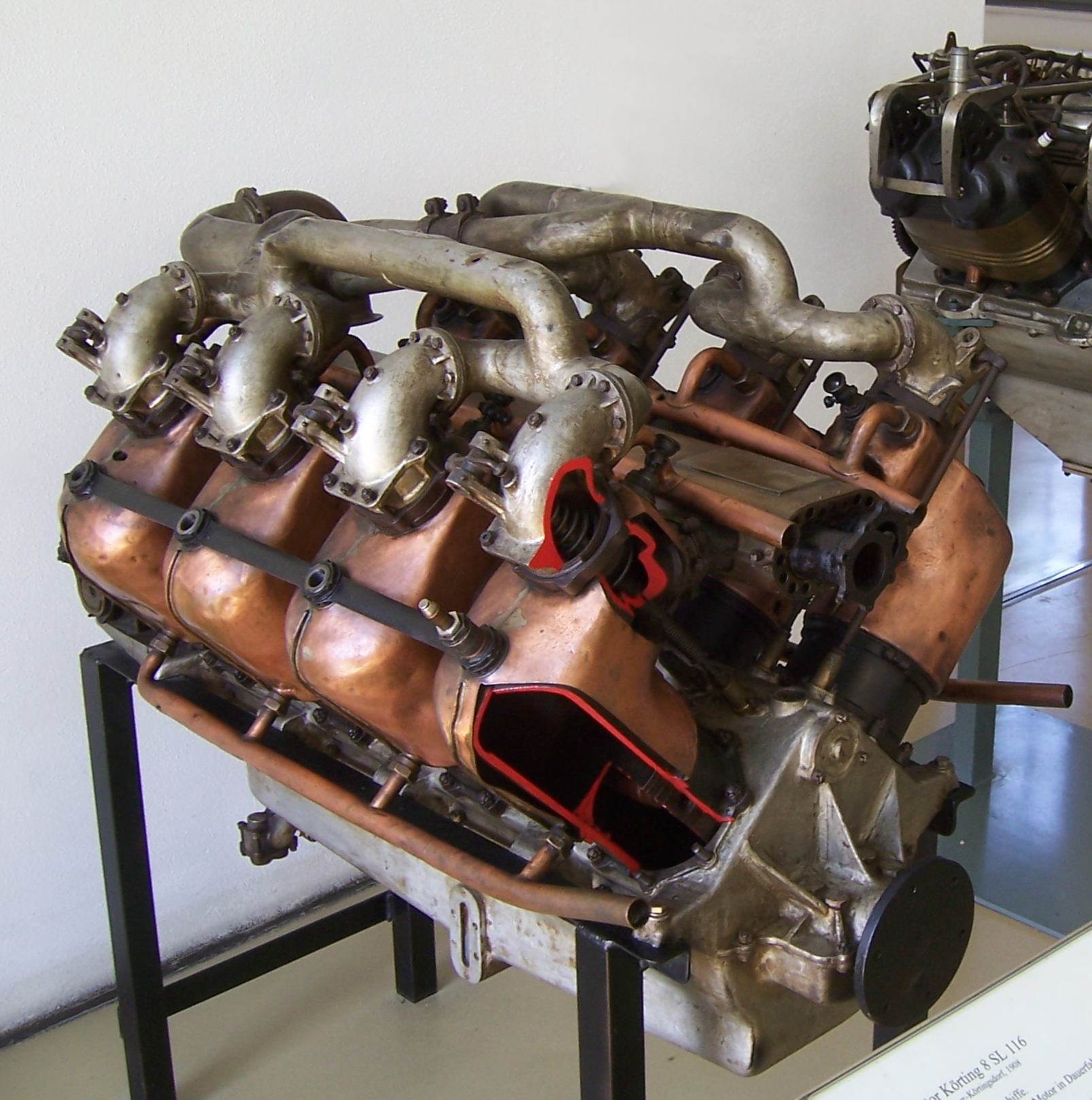
Körting 8 SL 116 V8 engine for airships

== Literature ==
- Wolfgang Leonhardt: List und Vahrenwald, zwei prägende Stadtteile von Hannover, Hamburg 2005, ISBN 3-8334-3333-7
- 125 Jahre Körting Hannover history of Körting AG for the 125th anniversary, 1996
