= SS Saxon Prince =

A number of steamships have carried the name Saxon Prince, including:

- SS Saxon Prince (1881), in service 1884–95, later Giltra
- SS Saxon Prince (1899), in service 1899–1916
