= U17 =

U17 or U-17 may refer to:

== Naval vessels ==
- Brazilian monitor Parnaíba (U17)
- German submarine U-17, various vessels
- SM U-17 (Austria-Hungary), a submarine of the Austro-Hungarian Navy

== Other uses ==
- Cessna U-17 Skywagon, an American utility aircraft
- Nonconvex great rhombicuboctahedron
- U17, or under-17, is a youth sports category.
