= German submarine U-17 =

U-17 may refer to one of the following German submarines:

- SM U-17 (Germany), was the lead ship of the Type U 17 class of submarines; launched in 1912 and served in the First World War until stricken on 27 January 1919
  - During the First World War, Germany also had these submarines with similar names:
    - SM UB-17, a Type UB I submarine launched in 1915 that disappeared in March 1918
    - SM UC-17, a Type UC II submarine launched in 1916 and surrendered 26 November 1918
- German submarine U-17 (1935), a Type IIB submarine that served in the Second World War and was scuttled on 5 May 1945
- German submarine U-17 (S196), a Type 206 submarine of the Bundesmarine that was launched in 1973 and decommissioned in 2010
