= List of shipwrecks in August 1915 =

The list of shipwrecks in August 1915 includes ships sunk, foundered, grounded, or otherwise lost during August 1915.

== 1 August ==
List of shipwrecks: 1 August 1915
Ship	State	Description
Alert	United Kingdom	World War I: The fishing smack was set afire and sunk in the North Sea 4 nautical miles (7.4 km) southeast of the Newarp Lightship (United Kingdom) by SM UB-10 (Imperial German Navy). Her crew survived.
Benvorlich	United Kingdom	World War I: The cargo ship was torpedoed and sunk in the Bay of Biscay 50 nautical miles (93 km) west of Ouessant, Finistère, France by SM U-28 (Imperial German Navy). Her crew survived.
Clintonia	United Kingdom	World War I: The cargo ship was torpedoed and sunk in the Bay of Biscay 30 nautical miles (56 km) southwest by west of Ouessant by SM U-28 (Imperial German Navy) with the loss of ten crew.
Fulgens	United Kingdom	World War I: The cargo ship was torpedoed and sunk in the North Sea 1 nautical mile (1.9 km) off Sea Palling, Norfolk by SM UB-10 (Imperial German Navy). Her crew survived.
Koophandel	Belgium	World War I: The cargo ship was torpedoed, shelled and sunk in the Atlantic Ocean (48°41′N 8°25′W) by SM U-28 (Imperial German Navy).
Lark	United Kingdom	World War I: The fishing vessel was sunk in the North Sea off Lowestoft, Suffolk by a Kaiserliche Marine submarine.
Ranza	United Kingdom	World War I: The cargo ship was torpedoed and sunk in the Bay of Biscay 50 nautical miles (93 km) southwest of Ouessant by SM U-28 (Imperial German Navy) with the loss of three of her crew.

== 2 August ==
List of shipwrecks: 2 August 1915
Ship	State	Description
Bencore Head	United Kingdom	The cargo ship collided with Batiscan (United Kingdom) off Cape Salmon, Quebec, Canada and was consequently beached.
HMS Portia	Royal Navy	World War I: The fleet messenger was shelled and sunk in the Atlantic Ocean 70 nautical miles (130 km) south of the Isles of Scilly by SM U-28 (Imperial German Navy). Her crew survived.

== 3 August ==
List of shipwrecks: 3 August 1915
Ship	State	Description
Costello	United Kingdom	World War I: The cargo ship was shelled and sunk in the Atlantic Ocean 95 nautical miles (176 km) south of the Bishop Rock, Isles of Scilly (49°02′N 8°30′W) by SM U-28 (Imperial German Navy) with the loss of a crew member.

== 4 August ==
List of shipwrecks: 4 August 1915
Ship	State	Description
HMS C33	Royal Navy	World War I: The C-class submarine struck a mine in the North Sea off Great Yarmouth, Norfolk and sank with the loss of all sixteen crew.
Challenger	United Kingdom	World War I: The fishing smack was scuttled in the North Sea 23 nautical miles (43 km) east by north of Lowestoft, Suffolk by SM UB-12 (Imperial German Navy). Her crew survived.
Grimbarian	United Kingdom	World War I: The trawler struck a mine and sank in the North Sea 56 nautical miles (104 km) east by north of Spurn Point, Yorkshire with the loss of six of her crew.
Heliotrope	United Kingdom	World War I: The fishing smack was scuttled in the North Sea 23 nautical miles (43 km) off Lowestoft by SM UB-12 (Imperial German Navy). Her crew survived.
Knickerbocker	United States	The schooner barge sank off Montauk Point.
Midland Queen	Canada	World War I: The cargo ship was shelled and sunk in the Atlantic Ocean 70 nautical miles (130 km) southwest by west of the Fastnet Rock by SM U-28 (Imperial German Navy). Her crew survived.

== 5 August ==
List of shipwrecks: 5 August 1915
Ship	State	Description
HMY Clementina	Royal Navy	The armed yacht collided with another vessel in the English Channel off Torpoint, Cornwall and was beached. She was a total loss.
Hans Emil	Denmark	World War I: The schooner was sunk in the North Sea (57°07′N 4°08′E) by SM U-38 (Imperial German Navy). Her crew survived.
Nereide	Regia Marina	World War I: The Nautlius-class submarine (1913) was torpedoed and sunk in the Adriatic Sea (42°23′N 16°16′E) by SM U-5 (Austro-Hungarian Navy) with the loss of all nineteen crew.
Vanadis	Denmark	World War I: The sailing vessel was sunk in the North Sea 56°49′N 5°02′E by SM U-38 (Imperial German Navy). Her crew survived.

== 6 August ==
List of shipwrecks: 6 August 1915
Ship	State	Description
C.E.S.	United Kingdom	World War I: The fishing smack was scuttled in the North Sea 42 nautical miles (78 km) east north east of Lowestoft, Suffolk by SM UB-17 (Imperial German Navy). Her crew survived.
Fisherman	United Kingdom	World War I: The fishing smack was scuttled in the North Sea 37 nautical miles (69 km) east north east of Lowestoft by SM UB-17 (Imperial German Navy). Her crew survived.
Hesperus	United Kingdom	World War I: The fishing smack was scuttled in the North Sea 37 nautical miles (69 km) east north east of Lowestoft by SM UB-17 (Imperial German Navy). Her crew survived.
Ivan	United Kingdom	World War I: The fishing smack was scuttled in the North Sea 42 nautical miles (78 km) east north east of Lowestoft by SM UB-17 (Imperial German Navy). Her crew survived.
HMT Leandros	Royal Navy	World War I: The naval trawler struck a mine and sank in the North Sea with the loss of seven of her crew.
Maj	Sweden	World War I: The coaster was sunk in the North Sea (56°58′N 6°48′E) by SM U-25 (Imperial German Navy). Her crew survived.
Ocean Queen	United Kingdom	World War I: The trawler was scuttled in the North Sea 25 nautical miles (46 km) north west of Muckle Flugga, Shetland Islands by SM U-38 (Imperial German Navy). Her crew survived.
Westminster	United Kingdom	World War I: The trawler was shelled and sunk in the North Sea (60°38′N 0°12′E) by SM U-38 (Imperial German Navy). Her crew were rescued by the drifter Maria Josepha (Netherlands).
Xmas Rose	United Kingdom	World War I: The fishing smack was scuttled in the North Sea off Lowestoft, Suffolk by SM UB-10 (Imperial German Navy). Her crew survived.

== 7 August ==
List of shipwrecks: 7 August 1915
Ship	State	Description
Geiranger	Norway	World War I: The cargo ship was sunk in the North Sea 70 nautical miles (130 km) east by southeast of Sumburgh Head, Shetland Islands, United Kingdom (59°33′N 1°39′E) by SM U-24 (Imperial German Navy). Her crew survived.
Norman	Norway	World War I: The barque was sunk in the North Sea 18 nautical miles (33 km) off Arendal, Nedenes county, Norway (58°15′N 9°24′E) by SM U-25 (Imperial German Navy). Her crew survived.

== 8 August ==
List of shipwrecks: 8 August 1915
Ship	State	Description
Arbor Vitae	United Kingdom	World War I: The fishing smack was scuttled in the North Sea 35 nautical miles (65 km) north east by north of Lowestoft, Suffolk by SM UB-10 (Imperial German Navy). Her crew survived.
Barbaros Hayreddin	Ottoman Navy	World War I: The Brandenburg-class battleship was torpedoed and sunk in the Sea of Marmara off Bolayır, Turkey by HMS E11 (Royal Navy) with the loss of 253 of her 568 crew.
Benarthur	United Kingdom	World War I: The cargo ship struck a mine and was damaged. She was beached but was a total loss.
Berk-i-Satvet	Ottoman Navy	World War I: The gunboat was torpedoed and sunk in the Dardanelles by a Royal Navy submarine.
HMT Ben Ardna	Royal Navy	World War I: The naval trawler struck a mine and sank in the English Channel with the loss of two of her crew.
Glenravel	United Kingdom	World War I: The cargo ship was scuttled in the North Sea 25 nautical miles (46 km) north of Kinnaird Head, Aberdeenshire (58°07′N 2°01′W) by SM U-17 (Imperial German Navy). Her crew survived.
Ilesha	United Kingdom	The motor barge was stranded on Bardsey Island, Gwynedd, Wales, in fog on a ballast voyage from Liverpool for West Africa. The crew was rescued by a trawler. She was later refloated but sank in deep water.
HMS India	Royal Navy	World War I: The armed merchant cruiser was torpedoed and sunk in the Norwegian Sea off Bodø in Nordland county, Norway by SM U-22 (Imperial German Navy) with the loss of 160 of the 311 people on board.
Malmland	Sweden	World War I: The cargo ship was sunk in the North Sea 2 nautical miles (3.7 km) east by south of Rattray Head, Aberdeenshire (57°35′N 1°39′W) by SM U-17 (Imperial German Navy). Her crew survived.
HMS Ramsey	Royal Navy	World War I: The armed boarding steamer was torpedoed and sunk in the North Sea
SMS T52	Imperial German Navy	World War I: The S43-class torpedo boat struck a mine and sank in the Gulf of Riga.
SMS T58	Imperial German Navy	World War I: The S58-class torpedo boat struck a mine and sank in the Gulf of Riga.
SM U-12	Austro-Hungarian Navy	World War I: The U-5-class submarine struck a mine and sank in the Venetian Lagoon with the loss of all seventeen crew.

== 9 August ==
List of shipwrecks: 9 August 1915
Ship	State	Description
HMS Lynx	Royal Navy	World War I: The Acasta-class destroyer struck a mine and sank in the North Sea. There were 26 survivors from her crew, which numbered about 100.
SMS Meteor	Imperial German Navy	SMS Meteor World War I: The auxiliary cruiser was scuttled in the North Sea. All on board were rescued by Royal Navy cruisers.
Thrush	United Kingdom	World War I: The 129.9-foot (39.6 m), 264-ton steam trawler was shelled and sunk, or scuttled with explosives, in the Atlantic Ocean 50 nautical miles (93 km) west of Eagle Island, County Mayo by SM U-38 (Imperial German Navy). Her crew survived, reaching shore in boats on 12 August.
Turkmenets-Stavropolsky	Imperial Russian Navy	The Ukraina-class destroyer ran aground in the Moonsund. She was refloated with assistance from the destroyer Molodetsky (Imperial Russian Navy). She was taken in to Helsinki, Grand Duchy of Finland the next day for repairs.

== 10 August ==
List of shipwrecks: 10 August 1915
Ship	State	Description
Aorangi	United Kingdom	World War I: The Admiralty requisitioned cargo ship was scuttled in Holm Sound, Scapa Flow as a blockship. Refloated in 1920, but broke lose and sank on a reef in Kirk Bay.
Aura	Norway	World War I: The coaster was sunk in the North Sea 13 nautical miles (24 km) off Marstenen in Nordland county 60°05′N 4°45′E by SM U-25 (Imperial German Navy). Her crew survived.
Esperance	United Kingdom	World War I: The fishing smack was scuttled in the North Sea 17 nautical miles (31 km) east north east of Cromer, Norfolk by SM UB-10 (Imperial German Navy). Her crew survived.
François	France	World War I: The barque was shelled and sunk in the Atlantic Ocean 60 nautical miles (110 km) west by southwest of the Fastnet Rock (50°40′N 10°51′W) by SM U-35 (Imperial German Navy). Her crew survived.
Morna	Norway	World War I: The sailing vessel was sunk in the Atlantic Ocean 40 nautical miles (74 km) southwest of the Fastnet Rock (50°40′N 11°10′W) by SM U-35 (Imperial German Navy). Her crew survived.
Oakwood	United Kingdom	World War I: The cargo ship was shelled and sunk in the Atlantic Ocean 45 nautical miles (83 km) south by southeast of the Old Head of Kinsale, County Cork by SM U-38 (Imperial German Navy). Her crew survived.
Rosalie	United Kingdom	World War I: The cargo ship was torpedoed and sunk in the North Sea off Blakeney, Norfolk by SM UB-10 (Imperial German Navy). Her crew survived.
Utopia	United Kingdom	World War I: The coaster was stopped, shelled and sunk in the North Sea 15 nautical miles (28 km) east of St. Abb's Head, Aberdeenshire by SM U-17 (Imperial German Navy). Her crew survived.

== 11 August ==
List of shipwrecks: 11 August 1915
Ship	State	Description
Franconia	United States	The 136 GRT schooner while on voyage from Windsor to New York with a cargo of lumber ran into dense fog off Chatham. Soon after she started to take in sail, the schooner was struck on her starboard side by steamer Onondaga making a 20-foot wide hole and nearly sinking the sailing vessel. There were no injuries or fatalities and the damaged vessel was brought into Boston by Onondaga. Franconia was rebuilt and returned to coastal service in January 1916.
George Borrow	United Kingdom	World War I: The fishing smack was scuttled in the North Sea 15 nautical miles (28 km) east north east of Cromer, Norfolk by SM UB-10 (Imperial German Navy). Her crew survived.
George Crabbe	United Kingdom	World War I: The fishing smack was scuttled in the North Sea 15 to 16 nautical miles (28 to 30 km) east north east of Cromer by SM UB-10 (Imperial German Navy). Her crew survived.
Humphrey	United Kingdom	World War I: The fishing smack was scuttled in the North Sea 48 nautical miles (89 km) east by south of Cromer by SM UB-10 (Imperial German Navy). Her crew survived.
Illustrious	United Kingdom	World War I: The fishing smack was scuttled in the North Sea 17 nautical miles (31 km) east by north of Cromer by SM UB-10 (Imperial German Navy). Her crew survived.
Leader	United Kingdom	World War I: The fishing smack was scuttled in the North Sea 20 nautical miles (37 km) east by north of Lowestoft, Suffolk by SM UB-6 (Imperial German Navy). Her crew survived.
Ocean's Gift	United Kingdom	World War I: The fishing smack was scuttled in the North Sea 16 nautical miles (30 km) east of Cromer by SM UB-10 (Imperial German Navy). Her crew survived.
Palm	United Kingdom	World War I: The fishing smack was scuttled in the North Sea 17 nautical miles (31 km) east by north of Cromer by SM UB-10 (Imperial German Navy). Her crew survived.
Trevear	United Kingdom	World War I: The fishing smack was scuttled in the North Sea 17 nautical miles (31 km) east by north of Cromer by SM UB-10 (Imperial German Navy). Her crew survived.
Welcome	United Kingdom	World War I: The fishing smack was scuttled in the North Sea 17 nautical miles (31 km) east by north of Cromer by SM UB-10 (Imperial German Navy). Her crew survived.
Young Admiral	United Kingdom	World War I: The fishing smack was scuttled in the North Sea 17 nautical miles (31 km) east by north of Cromer by SM UB-10 (Imperial German Navy). Her crew survived.

== 12 August ==
List of shipwrecks: 12 August 1915
Ship	State	Description
Grodno	United Kingdom	World War I: The cargo ship was torpedoed and sunk in the Arctic Sea 98 nautical miles (181 km) north west of the Lofoten Islands, Norway (68°55′N 9°08′E) by SM U-22 (Imperial German Navy). Her crew survived.
Jacona	United Kingdom	World War I: The 2,969 GRT cargo ship struck a mine and sank in the North Sea 25 nautical miles (46 km) north north west of Troupe Head, Banffshire with the loss of 29 of her crew.
Osprey	United Kingdom	World War I: The coaster was shelled and sunk in the Atlantic Ocean 40 nautical miles (74 km) north east by north of Nush Terrah, County Kerry by SM U-24 (Imperial German Navy). Her crew survived.
Sunflower	United Kingdom	World War I: The fishing smack was scuttled in the North Sea 30 nautical miles (56 km) east by north of Lowestoft, Suffolk by SM UB-5 (Imperial German Navy). Her crew survived.

== 13 August ==
List of shipwrecks: 13 August 1915
Ship	State	Description
Amethyst	United Kingdom	World War I: The fishing smack struck a mine and sank in the North Sea 7 nautical miles (13 km) east southeast of Lowestoft, Suffolk. Her crew survived.
Cairo	United Kingdom	World War I: The cargo ship was shelled and sunk in the Atlantic Ocean 34 nautical miles (63 km) south by southwest of the Tuskar Rock (51°44′N 6°33′W) by SM U-24 (Imperial German Navy). Her crew survived.
Campania		1915 Galveston hurricane: The ship was driven ashore at Galveston, Texas, United States. She was refloated on 21 August.
Curaçao	United Kingdom	The schooner was wrecked on Cayman Brac with the loss of all hands.
Eaton Hall	United Kingdom	1915 Galveston hurricane: The cargo ship was driven ashore at Galveston.
E.M.W.	United Kingdom	World War I: The fishing smack was scuttled in the North Sea 29 nautical miles (54 km) north east by east of Cromer, Norfolk by SM UB-5 (Imperial German Navy). Her crew survived.
El Mar	United States	The steamer went ashore in the harbor at Boston, Massachusetts after a steering failure.
Harlesden	United Kingdom	1915 Galveston hurricane: The cargo ship was driven ashore at Galveston.
Hawkhead	United Kingdom	1915 Galveston hurricane: The cargo ship was driven ashore at Galveston.
J.W.F.T.	United Kingdom	World War I: The fishing smack was scuttled in the North Sea 29 nautical miles (54 km) north east by north of Cromer by SM UB-5 (Imperial German Navy). Her crew survived.
Ribston	United Kingdom	1915 Galveston hurricane: The cargo ship was driven ashore at Galveston.
HMT Royal Edward	United Kingdom	World War I: The troopship was torpedoed and sunk in the Mediterranean Sea off Kandeloussa, Greece (36°31′N 25°51′E) by SM UB-14 (Imperial German Navy) with the loss of 935 of the 1,596 people on board.
Summerfield	United Kingdom	World War I: The coaster struck a mine and sank in the North Sea 2 nautical miles (3.7 km) east of Lowestoft with the loss of three of her crew.
Sverige	Sweden	World War I: The cargo ship struck a mine and sank in the North Sea 1.5 nautical miles (2.8 km) southeast of Lowestoft. Her crew survived.
SM U-3	Austro-Hungarian Navy	World War I: The U-3-class submarine was depth charged, shelled and sunk by Bisson (French Navy) with the loss of seven of her 21 crew.

== 14 August ==
List of shipwrecks: 14 August 1915
Ship	State	Description
Albis	Norway	World War I: The coaster was sunk in the Barents Sea 60 nautical miles (110 km) west north west of the Stad peninsula in Norway (62°20′N 3°15′E) by SM U-25 (Imperial German Navy). Her crew survived.
Bona Fide	United Kingdom	World War I: The fishing smack was scuttled in the North Sea 35 nautical miles (65 km) east north east of Lowestoft, Suffolk by SM UB-4 (Imperial German Navy). Her crew survived.
Gloria	United Kingdom	World War I: The trawler was shelled and sunk in the North Sea 55 nautical miles (102 km) east by north of Aberdeen by SM U-17 (Imperial German Navy). Her crew survived.
Princess Caroline	United Kingdom	World War I: The cargo ship struck a mine and sank in the North Sea 14 nautical miles (26 km) northeast of Kinnaird Head, Aberdeenshire with the loss of four of her crew.
Samsun	Ottoman Navy	World War I: The auxiliary minelayer was lost on this date.
White City	United Kingdom	World War I: The fishing smack was scuttled in the North Sea off Cromer, Norfolk by SM UB-5 (Imperial German Navy). Her crew survived.
HMT Worsley	Royal Navy	World War I: The naval trawler struck a mine and sank in the North Sea off Aldeburgh, Suffolk with the loss of a crew member.

== 15 August ==
List of shipwrecks: 15 August 1915
Ship	State	Description
Lackawanna	United States	The 137-foot (42 m), 340-gross register ton Delaware, Lackawanna and Western Railroad tug sank with the loss of two members of her crew in up to 50 feet (15 m) of water off the coast of Massachusetts in Nantucket Sound southwest of Handkerchief Shoal at 41°28.2′N 070°08.1′W after colliding with the barge Nanticoke.
Ladoga	Imperial Russian Navy	World War I: The minelayer struck a mine laid by the submarine SM UC-4 (Imperial German Navy) and sank in the Baltic Sea off Örö with the loss of five of her crew.
Marie	Denmark	World War I: The three-masted schooner was sunk in the North Sea 40 nautical miles (74 km) off Kinnaird Head, Aberdeenshire, United Kingdom by SM U-17 (Imperial German Navy). Her crew survived.
Sverige	Sweden	The cargo ship was beached at Halifax, Nova Scotia, Canada. She broke in two and was a total loss.
SMS T46	Imperial German Navy	World War I: The S43-class torpedo boat struck a mine and sank in the Gulf of Riga.
SM UB-4	Imperial German Navy	World War I: The Type UB I submarine was shelled and sunk in the North Sea off Lowestoft, Suffolk, United Kingdom (52°43′N 2°18′E) by HM Armed Smack Inverlyon (Royal Navy) with the loss of all fourteen crew.

== 16 August ==
List of shipwrecks: 16 August 1915
Ship	State	Description
Crockett	United States	1915 Galveston hurricane: The schooner dragged anchor and was thrown over the breakwater by the force of the hurricane and went to pieces. Her crew was rescued by soldiers from Fort Crockett.
Favorite	United States	The 12-net register ton motor vessel was wrecked on the coast of Hinchinbrook Island on the south-central coast of the Territory of Alaska after her gasoline engine broke down during a gale and she drifted ashore. All five people aboard – two passengers and three crew members – survived and were rescued on 21 August by the lighthouse tender USLHT Kukui ( United States Lighthouse Service).
Helen Henderson	United States	1915 Galveston hurricane: The tow steamer was sunk in the Texas City, Texas shipping channel during the hurricane. Six crew killed.
Linnea	Imperial Russian Navy	World War I: The auxiliary minesweeper struck a mine and sank in the Baltic Sea off Worms Island.
HMT Japan	Royal Navy	World War I: The naval trawler struck a mine and sank in the North Sea off the Shipwash Lightship (United Kingdom) with the loss of five of her crew.
HMT Lundy	Royal Navy	The naval trawler collided with another vessel and sank in the Dardanelles.
Romulus	Norway	World War I: The coaster was sunk in the North Sea 100 nautical miles (190 km) west southwest of Lindesnes, Lister og Mandal county, Norway (56°30′N 3°50′E) by SM U-17 (Imperial German Navy). Her crew were rescued by Else (Denmark).
Serbino	United Kingdom	World War I: The cargo ship was torpedoed and sunk in the Baltic Sea off the Worms Lighthouse by SM U-9 (Imperial German Navy). Her crew survived.
Tello	Norway	World War I: The cargo ship was captured and scuttled in the North Sea (57°00′N 5°03′E) by Götaland (Germany), which had a prize crew on board from SM U-17 (Imperial German Navy).

== 17 August ==
List of shipwrecks: 17 August 1915
Ship	State	Description
Bonny	United Kingdom	World War I: The cargo ship was shelled and sunk in St. George's Channel 16 nautical miles (30 km) south by east of the Tuskar Rock, Ireland by SM U-38 (Imperial German Navy). Her crew survived.
George Baker	United Kingdom	World War I: The drifter was shelled and sunk in the Atlantic Ocean 45 nautical miles (83 km) north of the Bishop Rock by SM U-38 (Imperial German Navy). Her crew survived.
Glenby	United Kingdom	World War I: The collier was shelled and sunk in St. George's Channel 30 nautical miles (56 km) north of the Smalls Lighthouse by SM U-38 (Imperial German Navy) with the loss of two crew.
Isidoro	Spain	World War I: The cargo ship was sunk in the Atlantic Ocean 17 nautical miles (31 km) east by southeast of the Tuskar Rock by SM U-38 (Imperial German Navy). Her crew survived.
Jalea	Regia Marina	World War I: The Medusa-class submarine sank in the Gulf of Trieste after striking an Austro-Hungarian mine.
Kirkby	United Kingdom	World War I: The collier was torpedoed and sunk in the Irish Sea 23 nautical miles (43 km) west by south of Bardsey Island, Pembrokeshire by SM U-38 (Imperial German Navy). Her crew survived.
Maggie	United Kingdom	World War I: The coaster was shelled and sunk in the Irish Sea 8 nautical miles (15 km) east of the South Arklow Lightship (United Kingdom) by SM U-38 (Imperial German Navy). Her crew survived.
Mineral	Norway	World War I: The coaster was shelled and sunk in the North Sea off Marstenen in Nordland county, Norway by SM U-25 (Imperial German Navy). Her crew survived.
Paros	United Kingdom	World War I: The cargo ship was torpedoed and sunk in the Irish Sea 30 nautical miles (56 km) west of Bardsey Island by SM U-38 (Imperial German Navy). Her crew survived.
Repeat	United Kingdom	World War I: The trawler was shelled and sunk in the Irish Sea 18 nautical miles (33 km) west by south of Bardsey Island by SM U-38 (Imperial German Navy). Her crew survived.
The Queen	United Kingdom	World War I: The passenger ship was shelled and sunk in St. George's Channel 40 nautical miles (74 km) north east of the Smalls Lighthouse by SM U-38 (Imperial German Navy). Her crew survived.
Thornfield	United Kingdom	World War I: The coaster was shelled and sunk in St. George's Channel 25 nautical miles (46 km) north north east of the Smalls Lighthouse by SM U-38 (Imperial German Navy). Her crew survived.
SMS V99	Imperial German Navy	World War I: Battle of the Gulf of Riga: The V99-class destroyer was shelled and damaged in the Gulf of Riga by Novik (Imperial Russian Navy). She then struck two mines and sank whilst attempting to escape.

== 18 August ==
List of shipwrecks: 18 August 1915
Ship	State	Description
Ben Vrachie	United Kingdom	World War I: The cargo ship was shelled and sunk in the Atlantic Ocean 55 nautical miles (102 km) north west by north of the Isles of Scilly by SM U-27 (Imperial German Navy). Her crew survived.
HMS E13	Royal Navy	HMS E13. World War I: The E-class submarine ran aground on Saltholm, Denmark. She was subsequently attacked by SMS G 132 and another torpedo boat (both Imperial German Navy) with the loss of fifteen of her 30 crew. The survivors were rescued by Royal Danish Navy torpedo boats. HMS E13 was later refloated but was declared beyond repair. She was scrapped in 1922.
Gladiator	United Kingdom	World War I: The cargo ship was shelled and sunk in the Atlantic Ocean 68 nautical miles (126 km) north by west of the Bishop Rock, Isles of Scilly by SM U-27 (Imperial German Navy). Her crew survived.
Magda	Norway	World War I: The cargo ship was sunk in the Atlantic Ocean 8 nautical miles (15 km) off Trevose Head, Cornwall, United Kingdom (50°39′N 5°09′W) by SM U-27 (Imperial German Navy). Her 16 crew survived.
HMT Poonah	Royal Navy	The naval trawler collided with another vessel and sank in Suvla Bay.
Sverresborg	Norway	World War I: The cargo ship was sunk in the Atlantic Ocean 8 nautical miles (15 km) off Trevose Head (50°50′N 5°10′W) by SM U-27 (Imperial German Navy). Her crew survived.

== 19 August ==
List of shipwrecks: 19 August 1915
Ship	State	Description
Arabic	United Kingdom	World War I: The ocean liner was torpedoed and sunk in the Atlantic Ocean off the Old Head of Kinsale, County Donegal by SM U-24 (Imperial German Navy) with the loss of 47 lives.
Baron Erskine	United Kingdom	World War I: The cargo ship was torpedoed and sunk in the Atlantic Ocean 25 nautical miles (46 km) north north west of the Bishop Rock, Isles of Scilly (50°12′N 6°50′W) by SM U-38 (Imperial German Navy). Her crew survived.
Ben Vrackie	United Kingdom	The collier was lost on this date.
Bras	Norway	World War I: The cargo ship was captured, shelled and sunk in the North Sea 4 nautical miles (7.4 km) off the Egerø Lighthouse in Rogaland county, Norway by SM U-25 (Imperial German Navy). Her crew survived.
Dunsley	United Kingdom	World War I: The cargo ship was shelled and sunk in the Atlantic Ocean 48 nautical miles (89 km) south by west of the Old Head of Kinsale, County Cork (50°55′N 8°18′W) by SM U-24 (Imperial German Navy) with the loss of two of her crew.
New York City	United Kingdom	World War I: The cargo ship was shelled and sunk in the Atlantic Ocean 44 nautical miles (81 km) south by southeast of the Fastnet Rock by SM U-24 (Imperial German Navy). Her crew survived.
Pena Castillo	Spain	World War I: The cargo ship was sunk in the Atlantic Ocean 33 nautical miles (61 km) north of the Wolf Rock, Cornwall United Kingdom (50°30′N 5°49′W) by SM U-27 (Imperial German Navy) with the loss of 23 crew.
Restormel	United Kingdom	World War I: The cargo ship was torpedoed and sunk in the Atlantic Ocean 28 nautical miles (52 km) north north west of the Bishop Rock (50°15′N 6°52′W) by SM U-38 (Imperial German Navy). Her crew survived.
SMS S31	Imperial German Navy	World War I: The S31-class torpedo boat struck a mine and sank in the Gulf of Riga.
Samara	United Kingdom	World War I: The cargo ship was shelled and sunk in the Atlantic Ocean 35 nautical miles (65 km) west of the Bishop Rock (49°45′N 7°20′W) by SM U-38 (Imperial German Navy). Her crew survived.
St. Olaf	United Kingdom	World War I: The schooner was shelled and sunk in the Atlantic Ocean 58 nautical miles (107 km) off Galley Head, County Cork (50°33′N 8°29′W) by SM U-24 (Imperial German Navy). Her crew survived.
Sivuch	Imperial Russian Navy	World War I, Battle of the Gulf of Riga: The Gilyak-class gunboat was sunk by gunfire in the Gulf of Riga by the battleships SMS Nassau and SMS Posen (both Imperial German Navy).
SM U-27	Imperial German Navy	World War I: Baralong Incident: The Type U-27 submarine was shelled and sunk in the Western Approaches 50°43′N 7°22′W by HMS Baralong (Royal Navy) with the loss of all 37 crew.

== 20 August ==
List of shipwrecks: 20 August 1915
Ship	State	Description
Bittern	United Kingdom	World War I: The cargo ship was shelled and sunk in the Bay of Biscay off Ouessant, Finistère, France 48°53′N 6°18′W by SM U-38 (Imperial German Navy). Her crew survived.
Carterswell	United Kingdom	World War I: The cargo ship was shelled and sunk in the Bay of Biscay 65 nautical miles (120 km) north west of Ouessant by SM U-38 (Imperial German Navy). Her crew survived.
Daghestan	Belgium	World War I: The tanker was captured, shelled and sunk in the Bay of Biscay off Ouessant (48°35′N 6°25′W) by SM U-38 (Imperial German Navy).
Korietz	Imperial Russian Navy	World War I, Battle of the Gulf of Riga: The Gilyak-class gunboat was blown up after she ran aground in the Gulf of Riga.
Martha Edwards	United Kingdom	World War I: The three-masted schooner was shelled and sunk in the Bay of Biscay 62 nautical miles (115 km) north north west of Ouessant by SM U-38 (Imperial German Navy). Her crew survived.
Rhonda	United Kingdom	World War I: The cargo ship was sunk as a blockship at Scapa Flow, Orkney Islands. Wreck blown up as a hazard to navigation in 1962.
Sakiz	Ottoman Navy	The guard ship was lost on this date.
Silver Wings	United Kingdom	The cargo ship ran aground on Sable Island, Nova Scotia, Canada and was abandoned.

== 21 August ==
List of shipwrecks: 21 August 1915
Ship	State	Description
Cober	United Kingdom	World War I: The cargo ship was torpedoed and sunk in the Atlantic Ocean 45 nautical miles (83 km) south by southwest of the Isles of Scilly (49°10′N 6°30′W) by SM U-38 (Imperial German Navy). Her crew survived.
Ruel	United Kingdom	World War I: The cargo ship was shelled and sunk in the Atlantic Ocean 45 nautical miles (83 km) southwest of the Bishop Rock, Isles of Scilly (49°25′N 7°10′W) by SM U-38 (Imperial German Navy) with the loss of a crew member.
William Dawson	United Kingdom	World War I: The coaster struck a mine and sank in the English Channel 1 nautical mile (1.9 km) off Boulogne, Pas-de-Calais, France with the loss of five of her crew.
Windsor	United Kingdom	World War I: The cargo ship was shelled and sunk in the Atlantic Ocean 70 nautical miles (130 km) southwest of the Wolf Rock, Cornwall by SM U-38 (Imperial German Navy). Her crew survived.

== 22 August ==
List of shipwrecks: 22 August 1915
Ship	State	Description
Diomed	United Kingdom	World War I: The cargo ship was shelled and sunk in the Atlantic Ocean 57 nautical miles (106 km) west north west of the Isles of Scilly (50°21′N 6°40′W) by SM U-38 (Imperial German Navy). Her crew survived.
Orion	Brazil	The passenger ship ran aground at Macucos and was wrecked. All on board were rescued.
Palmgrove	United Kingdom	World War I: The cargo ship was shelled and sunk in the Atlantic Ocean 40 nautical miles (74 km) west by north of the Isles of Scilly (49°25′N 7°40′W) by SM U-38 (Imperial German Navy). Her crew survived.

== 23 August ==
List of shipwrecks: 23 August 1915
Ship	State	Description
SMS A15	Imperial German Navy	World War I: The A1-class torpedo boat was shelled and sunk in the North Sea off the coast of Belgium by Branlebas and Oriflamme (both French Navy).
Boy Bert	United Kingdom	World War I: The fishing smack was scuttled in the North Sea 50 nautical miles (93 km) off Lowestoft, Suffolk by SM UB-12 (Imperial German Navy). Her crew survived.
Commander Boyle	United Kingdom	World War I: The trawler struck a mine and sank in the North Sea 40 nautical miles (74 km) north by west of Rattray Head, Aberdeenshire with the loss of three of her crew.
Integrity	United Kingdom	World War I: The fishing smack was scuttled in the North Sea 24 nautical miles (44 km) east by southeast of Cromer, Norfolk by SM UB-12 (Imperial German Navy). Her crew survived.
HMT Miura	Royal Navy	World War I: The naval trawler was torpedoed and sunk in the North Sea off Great Yarmouth, Norfolk (52°36′N 1°54′E) by SM UB-2 (Imperial German Navy) with the loss of eleven crew.
Silvia	United Kingdom	World War I: The tanker was shelled and sunk in the Atlantic Ocean 47 nautical miles (87 km) west of the Fastnet Rock (51°50′N 10°46′W) by SM U-38 (Imperial German Navy). Her crew survived.
Trafalgar	United Kingdom	World War I: The cargo ship was scuttled in the Atlantic Ocean 54 nautical miles (100 km) southwest by west of the Fastnet Rock (50°53′N 10°48′W) by SM U-38 (Imperial German Navy). Her crew survived.

== 25 August ==
List of shipwrecks: 25 August 1915
Ship	State	Description
Disa	Sweden	World War I: The coaster struck a mine and sank in the North Sea 5 to 6 nautical miles (9.3 to 11.1 km) north by east of the Shipwash Lightship (United Kingdom) (52°09′N 1°39′E). Her crew survived.
Petshora	Russia	World War I: The cargo ship was sunk in the Gulf of Finland by SM U-26 (Imperial German Navy).
Young Frank	United Kingdom	World War I: The fishing smack was scuttled in the North Sea 38 nautical miles (70 km) north by east of Lowestoft, Suffolk by SM UB-12 (Imperial German Navy). Her crew survived.

== 26 August ==
List of shipwrecks: 26 August 1915
Ship	State	Description
HMT Jasper	Royal Navy	The naval trawler was lost on this date.
Sahina Noria	Italy	World War I: The sailing vessel was sunk in the Aegean Sea off Orak, Rabbit Islands, Turkey by SM UC-13 (Imperial German Navy).

== 28 August ==
List of shipwrecks: 28 August 1915
Ship	State	Description
HMT Dane	Royal Navy	World War I: The naval trawler struck a mine and sank in the North Sea off Aldeburgh, Suffolk with the loss of five of her crew.
HMY Dolores	Royal Navy	The naval yacht was destroyed by fire at Douglas, Isle of Man.

== 29 August ==
List of shipwrecks: 29 August 1915
Ship	State	Description
HMS C29	Royal Navy	World War I: The C-class submarine struck a mine and sank in the Humber Estuary with the loss of all sixteen crew.
Gangut	Imperial Russian Navy	The Gangut-class battleship ran aground off Porkkalanniemi, Grand Duchy of Finland. She was refloated.
Sevastopol	Imperial Russian Navy	The Gangut-class battleship ran aground of Porkkalanniemi. She was refloated and taken in to Kronstadt for repairs.
Sir William Stephenson	United Kingdom	World War I: The passenger ship struck a mine and sank in the North Sea off the Cockle Lightship with the loss of two lives.

== 30 August ==
List of shipwrecks: 30 August 1915
Ship	State	Description
Bretwalda	United Kingdom	World War I: The cargo ship struck a mine and was damaged in the North Sea 3 nautical miles (5.6 km) east of the Longsand Lightship (United Kingdom). She was beached but was later refloated, repaired and returned to service.
Honiton	United Kingdom	World War I: The cargo ship struck a mine and was damaged in the North Sea 2.5 nautical miles (4.6 km) east of the Longsand Lightship. She was beached at Shoeburyness, Essex but was declared a total loss.
Zemlya	Russia	World War I: The coaster was sunk in the Baltic Sea off Worms Island (59°02′N 23°02′E) by SM U-26 (Imperial German Navy).

== 31 August ==
List of shipwrecks: 31 August 1915
Ship	State	Description
Edith	United States	The cargo ship foundered in the Pacific Ocean 47 nautical miles (87 km) east of Cape St. Elias, Alaska. Her crew were rescued by Mariposa (United States).

== Unknown date ==
List of shipwrecks: Unknown date in August 1915
Ship	State	Description
Zaritza	Russia	The barque was lost in a collision in the Baltic Sea off Skagen, Denmark.
