= SM U-17 (Germany) =

German submarine that served in WWI

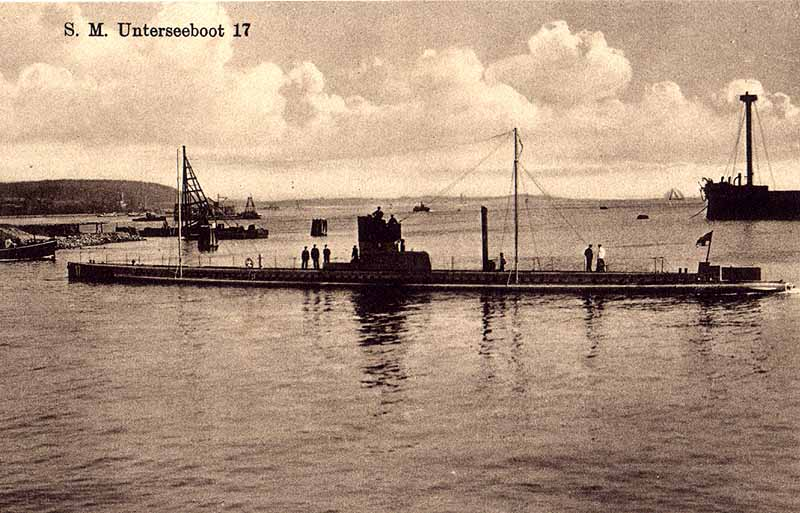
- U 17 on a pre-war postcard

History

Germany
- Name: U-17
- Ordered: 10 May 1910
- Builder: Kaiserliche Werft Danzig
- Cost: 2,333,000 Goldmark
- Yard number: 11
- Laid down: 1 October 1910
- Launched: 16 April 1912
- Commissioned: 3 November 1912
- Stricken: 27 January 1919
- Fate: Struck 27 January 1919, scrapped at Imperial Dockyard, Kiel. Pressure hull sold to Stinnes, Hamburg on 3 February 1920.

General characteristics
- Class & type: Type U 17 submarine
- Displacement: 564 t (555 long tons) surfaced; 691 t (680 long tons) submerged
- Length: 62.35 m (204 ft 7 in)
- Beam: 6 m (19 ft 8 in)
- Height: 7.30 m (23 ft 11 in)
- Draught: 3.40 m (11 ft 2 in)
- Propulsion: 2 shafts; 2 × 2 Körting 8-cylinder two stroke paraffin motors with 1,400 PS (1,000 kW; 1,400 shp); 2 × AEG electric motors with 1,120 PS (820 kW; 1,100 shp); 550 rpm surfaced; 425 rpm submerged
- Speed: 14.9 knots (27.6 km/h; 17.1 mph) surfaced; 9.5 knots (17.6 km/h; 10.9 mph) submerged
- Range: 6,700 nautical miles (12,400 km; 7,700 mi) at 8 knots (15 km/h; 9.2 mph) surfaced; 75 nautical miles (139 km; 86 mi) at 5 knots (9.3 km/h; 5.8 mph) submerged
- Test depth: 50 m (164 ft 1 in)
- Boats & landing craft carried: 1 dinghy
- Complement: 4 officers, 25 men
- Armament: 4 × 45 cm (17.7 in) torpedo tubes (2 each bow and stern); 6 torpedoes; 1 × 5 cm (2.0 in) SK L/40 gun; 1 × 3.7 cm (1.5 in) Hotchkiss gun

Service record
- Part of: II Flotilla; 1 August 1914 – unknown end; Baltic Flotilla; unknown start – 10 January 1916; Training Flotilla; 10 January 1916 – 11 November 1918
- Commanders: Oblt.z.S. Johannes Feldkirchener; 1 August 1914 – 7 March 1915; Kptlt. Hans Walther; 2 March 1915 – 9 January 1916
- Operations: 4 patrols
- Victories: 11 merchant ships sunk (15,122 GRT); 1 merchant ship damaged (4,590 GRT); 2 merchant ships taken as prize (4,956 GRT)

SM U-17 (Note: "SM" stands for "Seiner Majestät" (English: His Majesty's) and combined with the U for Unterseeboot would be translated as His Majesty's Submarine.) was a German submarine during World War I. U-17 sank the first British merchant vessel in the First World War, and also sank another ten ships, damaged one ship and captured two ships, surviving the war without casualty.

== War service ==
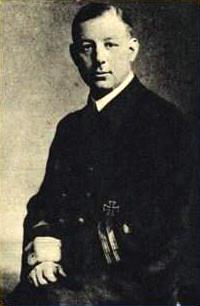
Oberleutnant z.S. Feldkirchner

On 1 August 1914, Oberleutnant zur See Johannes Feldkirchner was given command of U-17. On 20 October, U-17 stopped the 866 ton SS Glitra off the Norwegian coast, and having searched her cargo, ordered the crew to the lifeboats before scuttling the vessel. On 26 October, U-17 torpedoed the French ferry SS Amiral Ganteaume† in the Strait of Dover. The vessel made port before sinking, with the loss of 40 lives out of over 2,500 on board.
† - www.uboat.net credits the damage to the French steamer Amiral Ganteaume to U-24.

On 2 March 1915 the command of U-17 passed to Kapitänleutnant Hans Walther. On 12 June 1915, U-17 chased and torpedoed the SS Desabla off the coast of Scotland. The crew escaped on lifeboats while the vessel was scuttled and sunk. Walther's command ended on 9 January 1916 and the next day U-17 joined the Training Flotilla.

== Post war ==
U-17 was decommissioned on 27 January 1919 and sold for scrapping.

== Summary of raiding history ==
Date	Ship Name	Nationality	Tonnage (Note: Tonnages are in gross register tons)	Fate
20 October 1914	Glitra	United Kingdom	866	Sunk
26 October 1914	Amiral Ganteaume	France	4,590	Damaged
12 June 1915	Cocos	Denmark	85	Sunk
12 June 1915	Desabla	United Kingdom	6,047	Sunk
18 June 1915	Ailsa	United Kingdom	876	Sunk
8 August 1915	Glenravel	United Kingdom	1,092	Sunk
8 August 1915	Malmland	Sweden	3,676	Sunk
10 August 1915	Utopia	United Kingdom	155	Sunk
14 August 1915	Gloria	United Kingdom	130	Sunk
15 August 1915	Götaland	Sweden	3,538	Captured as prize
15 August 1915	Marie	Denmark	158	Sunk
16 August 1915	Romulus	Norway	819	Sunk
16 August 1915	Tello	Norway	1,218	Sunk
24 October 1915	Rumina	Sweden	1,418	Captured as prize
