= SS Desabla =

Oil tanker

History
- Name: Desabla
- Owner: Bank Line Ltd., Glasgow
- Operator: Andrew Weir Shipping & Trading Co. Ltd.
- Port of registry: (United Kingdom of Great Britain and Ireland) Glasgow
- Builder: Hawthorn Leslie & Co Ltd, Newcastle
- Yard number: 461
- Launched: 18 September 1913
- Identification: Official Number: 133159; Code Letters: JDKN; Wireless Code: GYV (1914)
- Fate: Sunk, 12 June 1915

General characteristics
- Type: Oil tanker
- Tonnage: 6,047 GRT; 5,742 under deck; 3,788 NRT
- Length: 420.3 ft (128.11 m)
- Beam: 54.6 ft (16.64 m)
- Depth: 32.4 ft (9.88 m)
- Crew: 35

SS Desabla was built by Hawthorn Leslie & Co. Ltd at Newcastle upon Tyne in 1913 for Bank Line of Glasgow (Andrew Weir Shipping & Trading Co. Ltd). She was the first oil tanker to join the Bank Line fleet and was chartered and operated for approximately one year by General Petroleum Company along the Pacific coast of the United States, Chile, and Canada. In 1914 she was re-chartered to the British Government to transport oil from Texas to the United Kingdom. In 1915 she was torpedoed and sunk by the German submarine U-17 off the coast of Scotland.

== Career ==
The vessel was constructed in 1913 at Newcastle, England and launched on 18 September 1913. On 29 November 1913 Desabla departed from North Shields, England (most of the crew joined here). From 14 February to 2 March 1914 from Antofagasta, Chile, to San Pedro, California. From 14 May to 2 June the tanker sailed from Taltal, Chile, to San Luis Obispo, California. Desabla then sailed for Vancouver, British Columbia, on 3 June. From 14 to 18 June, the ship made a return trip to Port Harford, San Luis Obispo, California before moving on to Iquique, Chile, the following day. On 12 October Desabla passed through the Panama Canal en route from Rio de Janeiro, Brazil to San Pedro.

=== Sinking ===
On 12 June 1915 Desabla was carrying a cargo of linseed oil from Port Arthur, Texas bound for Hull. The tanker was chased and intercepted by the German submarine U-17. While the crew escaped in lifeboats, she was shelled, torpedoed and finally had to be scuttled with charges placed in the hull to sink her.

Excerpt from the Admiralty Report into the sinking:
"This Admiralty Oiler Transport No.63 was steaming on course when the German Submarine U-17 was seen right astern, gaining rapidly on the Steamship. The Master endeavoured to keep the vessel astern making various violent changes of course, but the submarine was much faster and rapidly took up a position close to the ship. The Enemy commenced to shell the Desabla at 07:20 am and kept up a continual fire at her from a Deck Gun. Realising that escape was impossible, the master stopped his Engine and ordered all hands into the Boats, which were successfully lowered at 08:20 am, allowing all the Crew to escape safely. Shortly after the enemy fired a Torpedo into the Ship at 08:30 am, but as she did not sink immediately some members of the crew went aboard her, presumably to place explosive charges and to loot her. When last seen by the Master at 12:30 pm, his ship was sinking fast and the Submarine had submerged out of sight. The survivors were picked up by the Armed Trawlers at 3:30 pm and taken ashore."

== The wreck ==
The official report stated the wreck was 10 miles (16 km) from Tod Head, Scotland. Divers searched there for years. However, the wreck of Desabla was actually discovered 35 miles (56 km) from Montrose, Scotland. After a number of attempts, she was located in 2010 by divers from Marine Quest based in Eyemouth, Berwickshire.
