= SM UB-12 =

German Type UB I-class submarine

History

German Empire
- Name: UB-12
- Ordered: 15 October 1914
- Builder: AG Weser, Bremen
- Yard number: 221
- Laid down: 7 November 1914
- Launched: 2 March 1915
- Commissioned: 29 March 1915
- Fate: Disappeared after 19 August 1918

General characteristics
- Class & type: Type UB I submarine
- Displacement: 127 t (125 long tons) surfaced; 141 t (139 long tons) submerged
- Length: 27.88 m (91 ft 6 in) (o/a)
- Beam: 3.15 m (10 ft 4 in)
- Draft: 3.03 m (9 ft 11 in)
- Propulsion: 1 × propeller shaft; 1 × Körting 4-cylinder diesel engine, 59 bhp (44 kW); 1 × Siemens-Schuckert electric motor, 119 shp (89 kW)
- Speed: 7.45 knots (13.80 km/h; 8.57 mph) surfaced; 6.24 knots (11.56 km/h; 7.18 mph) submerged
- Range: 1,500 nmi (2,800 km; 1,700 mi) at 5 knots (9.3 km/h; 5.8 mph) surfaced; 45 nmi (83 km; 52 mi) at 4 knots (7.4 km/h; 4.6 mph) submerged
- Test depth: 50 metres (160 ft)
- Complement: 14
- Armament: 2 × 45 cm (17.7 in) bow torpedo tubes; 2 × torpedoes; 1 × 8 mm (0.31 in) machine gun
- Notes: 33-second diving time

Service record
- Part of: Flandern Flotilla; 18 April 1915 – 19 August 1918
- Commanders: Oblt.z.S. Hans Nieland; 29 March – 20 November 1915; Oblt.z.S. Wilhelm Kiel; 21 November 1915 – 25 June 1916; Oblt.z.S. Georg Gerth; 26 June – 4 November 1916; Oblt.z.S. Friedrich Moecke; 5 November 1916 – 19 January 1917; Oblt.z.S. Ernst Steindorff; 20 January – 7 August 1917; Oblt.z.S. Günther Wigankow; 8 August – 23 September 1917; Oblt.z.S. Wilhelm Braun; 24 September 1917 – 9 March 1918; Oblt.z.S. Freiherr Nikolaus von Lyncker; 10 March – 9 May 1918; Oblt.z.S. Ernst Schöller; 10 May – 19 August 1918
- Operations: 98 patrols
- Victories: 17 merchant ships sunk (8,970 GRT); 1 warship sunk (995 tons); 5 auxiliary warships sunk (1,293 GRT); 1 merchant ship taken as prize (654 GRT)

SM UB-12 was a German Type UB I submarine or U-boat in the German Imperial Navy (German: Kaiserliche Marine) during World War I. The submarine disappeared in August 1918.

UB-12 was ordered in October 1914 and was laid down at the AG Weser shipyard in Bremen in November. UB-12 was a little under 28 metres (92 ft) in length and displaced between 127 and 141 tonnes (125 and 139 long tons), depending on whether surfaced or submerged. She carried two torpedoes for her two bow torpedo tubes and was also armed with a deck-mounted machine gun. UB-12 was broken into sections and shipped by rail to Antwerp for reassembly. She was launched and commissioned as SM UB-12 in March 1915. (Note: "SM" stands for "Seiner Majestät" (English: His Majesty's) and combined with the U for Unterseeboot would be translated as His Majesty's Submarine.)

UB-12 spent her entire career in the Flanders Flotilla and sank 22 ships, about half of them British fishing vessels. The U-boat was also responsible for sinking the British destroyer HMS Laforey in 1917. By early 1917, UB-12 had been converted into a minelayer with the replacement of her torpedo tubes with four mine chutes. UB-12 disappeared after 19 August 1918.

== Design and construction ==
After the German Army's rapid advance along the North Sea coast in the earliest stages of World War I, the German Imperial Navy found itself without suitable submarines that could be operated in the narrow and shallow seas off Flanders. Project 34, a design effort begun in mid-August 1914, produced the Type UB I design: a small submarine that could be shipped by rail to a port of operations and quickly assembled. Constrained by railroad size limitations, the UB I design called for a boat about 28 metres (92 ft) long and displacing about 125 t (123 long tons) with two torpedo tubes. (Note: A further refinement of the design—replacing the torpedo tubes with mine chutes but changing little else—evolved into the Type UC I coastal minelaying submarine. See: Miller, p. 458.)

UB-12 was part of the initial allotment of seven submarines—numbered UB-9 to UB-15—ordered on 15 October from AG Weser of Bremen, just shy of two months after planning for the class began. UB-12 was laid down by Weser in Bremen on 7 November. As built, UB-12 was 27.88 metres (91 ft 6 in) long, 3.15 metres (10 ft 4 in) abeam, and had a draft of 3.03 metres (9 ft 11 in). She had a single 59-brake-horsepower (44 kW) Körting 4-cylinder diesel engine for surface travel, and a single 119-shaft-horsepower (89 kW) Siemens-Schuckert electric motor for underwater travel, both attached to a single propeller shaft. Her top speeds were 7.45 knots (13.80 km/h; 8.57 mph), surfaced, and 6.24 knots (11.56 km/h; 7.18 mph), submerged. At more moderate speeds, she could sail up to 1,500 nautical miles (2,800 km; 1,700 mi) on the surface before refueling, and up to 45 nautical miles (83 km; 52 mi) submerged before recharging her batteries. Like all boats of the class, UB-12 was rated to a diving depth of 50 metres (160 ft), and could completely submerge in 33 seconds.

UB-12 was armed with two 45-centimeter (17.7 in) torpedoes in two bow torpedo tubes. She was also outfitted for a single 8-millimeter (0.31 in) machine gun on deck. UB-12's standard complement consisted of one officer and thirteen enlisted men.

After work on UB-12 was complete at the Weser yard, she was readied for rail shipment. The process of shipping a UB I boat involved breaking the submarine down into what was essentially a knock down kit. Each boat was broken into approximately fifteen pieces and loaded onto eight railway flatcars. In February 1915, the sections of UB-12 were shipped to Antwerp for assembly in what was typically a two- to three-week process. After UB-12 was assembled and launched on 2 March, she was loaded on a barge and taken through canals to Bruges where she underwent trials.

== Early career ==
The submarine was commissioned into the German Imperial Navy as SM UB-12 on 29 March 1915 under the command of Kapitänleutnant (Kapt.) Hans Nieland, a 29-year-old first-time U-boat commander. (Note: Nieland was in the Navy's April 1905 cadet class with 36 other future U-boat captains, including Hermann von Fischel, Carl-Siegfried Ritter von Georg, Kurt Hartwig, Hans von Mellenthin, and Wilhelm Werner. See: Helgason, Guðmundur. "WWI Officer Crews: Crew 4/05". German and Austrian U-boats of World War I - Kaiserliche Marine - Uboat.net.) On 18 April, UB-12 joined the Flanders Flotilla (German: U-boote des Marinekorps U-Flotille Flandern), which had been organized on 29 March. When UB-12 joined the flotilla, Germany was in the midst of its first submarine offensive, begun in February. During this campaign, enemy vessels in the German-defined war zone (German: Kriegsgebiet), which encompassed all waters around the United Kingdom, were to be sunk. Vessels of neutral countries were not to be attacked unless they definitively could be identified as enemy vessels operating under a false flag.

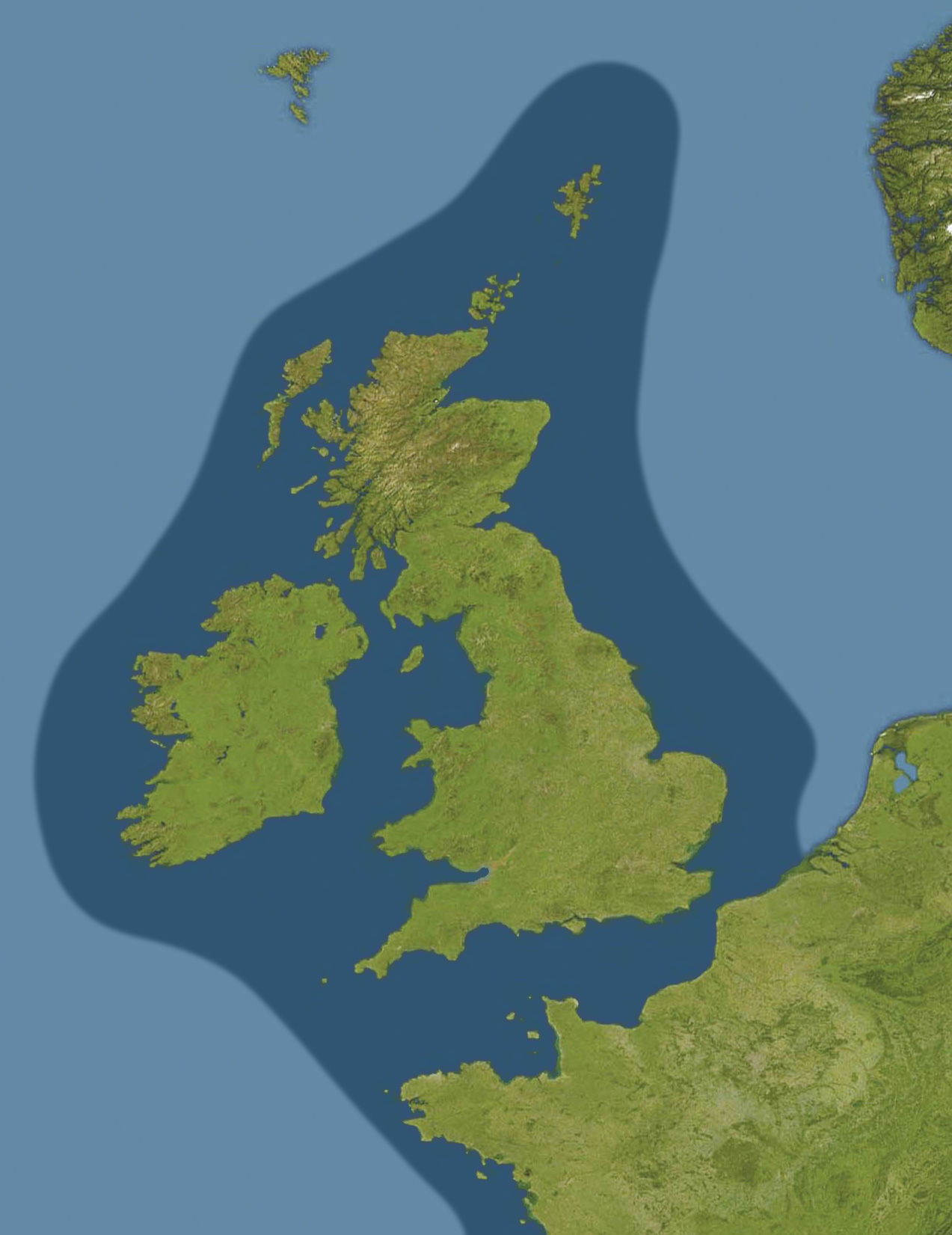
The German war zone (German: Kriegsgebiet) for the first submarine offensive.

On 24 July, Nieland and UB-12 sank four British fishing vessels while patrolling between 30 nautical miles (56 km; 35 mi) east-northeast of Lowestoft. All four of the sunken ships were smacks—sailing vessels traditionally rigged with red ochre sails—which were stopped, boarded by crewmen from UB-12, and sunk with explosives. UB-12 similarly sank a pair of smacks off Lowestoft on 4 August, and another trio from 23 to 25 August.

On 21 November, Nieland was succeeded by Oberleutnant zur See (Oblt.) Wilhelm Kiel in command of UB-12. Under Kiel's command, UB-12 sank three ships on 21 February 1916: the 92 GRT Belgian fishing ship La Petite Henriette, the largest sunk to-date by UB-12, and another pair of British smacks, Oleander and W.E. Brown.

UB-12 sank her largest ship, Silksworth Hall of 4,777 gross register tons (GRT), on 10 April. The British-registered ship was en route from Hull to Philadelphia in ballast when Kiel torpedoed her without warning a little more than one nautical mile (two kilometers) from the Corton Lightvessel. Other ships picked up 31 survivors from Silksworth Hall, but 3 men were lost. Later in the month, Admiral Reinhardt Scheer, the newest commander-in-chief of the High Seas Fleet, called off the merchant shipping offensive and ordered all boats at sea to return, and all boats in port to remain there.

== Grand Fleet ambush attempts ==
In mid-May, Scheer completed plans to draw out part of the British Grand Fleet. The German High Seas Fleet would sortie for a raid on Sunderland, luring the British fleet across "'nests' of submarines and mine-fields". In support of the operation, UB-12 and five other Flanders boats set out at midnight 30/31 May to form a line 18 nautical miles (33 km; 21 mi) east of Lowestoft. (Note: The other five boats for the May action were UB-6, UB-10, UB-16, UB-17, and UB-29.) This group was to intercept and attack the British light forces from Harwich, should they sortie north to join the battle. Unfortunately for the Germans, the British Admiralty had intelligence reports of the departure of the submarines which, coupled with an absence of attacks on shipping, aroused British suspicions.

A delayed departure of the German High Seas Fleet for its sortie (which had been redirected to the Skagerrak) and the failure of several of the U-boats stationed to the north to receive the coded message warning of the British advance caused Scheer's anticipated ambush to be a "complete and disappointing failure". In UB-12's group, only UB-10 sighted the Harwich forces, and they were too far away to mount an attack. The failure of the submarine ambush to sink any British capital ships allowed the full Grand Fleet to engage the numerically inferior High Seas Fleet in the Battle of Jutland, which took place 31 May – 1 June.

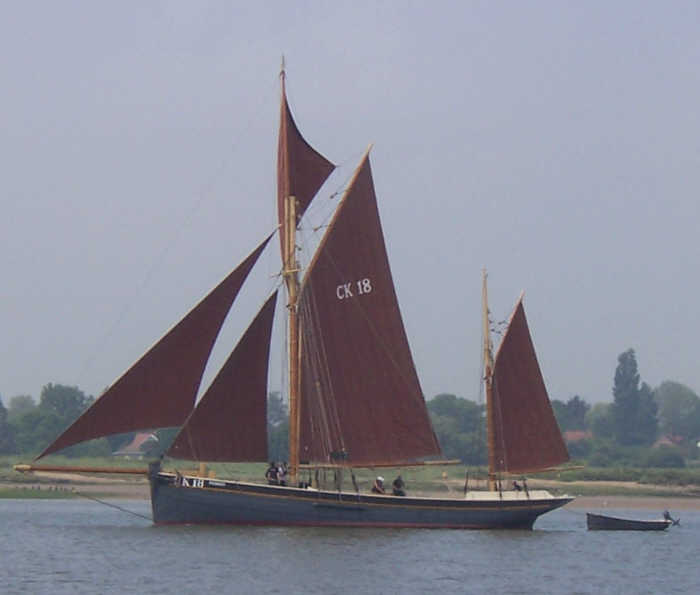
About half of UB-12's 22 victims were fishing smacks, traditionally outfitted with red ochre sails, like this contemporary smack.

Kapitänleutnant Georg Gerth took command of UB-12 on 26 June, Oblt.Kiel was assigned to command the new minelaying submarine UC-18. Two months later, Admiral Scheer set up another ambush for the British fleet with plans for another High Seas Fleet raid on Sunderland (as had been the original intention in May). The German fleet planned to depart late in the day on 18 August and shell military targets the next morning. As in May, UB-12 was part of a group intended to attack the Harwich forces. As one of five boats forming the second line of boats from the Flanders Flotilla, (Note: The other four boats for the August action were UB-6, UB-16, UB-19, and UB-37.) UB-12 was stationed off Texel by the morning of 20 August. Once again, British intelligence had given warning of the impending attack and ambush, causing the Grand Fleet to sortie at 16:00 on 18 August, five hours before the German fleet sailed. Faulty intelligence caused Scheer initially to divert from Sunderland, and then to eventually call off the whole operation. Although U-boats to the north sank two British light cruisers, (Note: U-52 sank HMS Nottingham; U-66 and U-63 teamed up to sink HMS Falmouth.) UB-12 and her group played no part in the action.

In September, Gerth led UB-12 in sinking two more ships and capturing a third ship as a prize. The 313 GRT Norwegian steamer Rilda was sunk on 6 September, while the 55 GRT Marjorie was sunk on the 28th. In between the Dutch ship Niobe was seized as a prize on the 7th.

== Conversion to minelayer ==
UB-12 and three sister boats—UB-10, UB-16, and UB-17—were all converted to minelaying submarines. UB-12 was at the dockyard from November 1916 to January 1917, and it is likely the boat was converted during this timeframe. The conversion involved removing the bow section containing the pair of torpedo tubes from each U-boat and replacing it with a new bow containing four mine chutes capable of carrying two mines each. In the process, the boats were lengthened to 105 feet (32 m), and the displacement increased to 147 t (145 long tons) on the surface, and 161 t (158 long tons) below the surface.

During this same time, Kapt. Gerth was transferred to SM UC-61, and replaced on UB-12 by Oblt. Friedrich Moecke in early November. Moecke was, in turn, replaced by Oblt. Ernst Steindorff in January 1917.

By March, the newly converted submarine had begun laying mines off the French coast. The French Navy trawler Elisabeth struck one of UB-12's mines off Calais on 13 March and sank. Five days later, the British auxiliary minesweeper HMS Duchess of Montrose sank with a loss of 12 men after detonating a mine laid by UB-12 off Gravelines. On 23 March, HMS Laforey, a destroyer with the Dover Patrol, struck one of UB-12's mines off Cape Gris-Nez and went down with the loss of 59 men.

In May, UB-12 was on a patrol with UB-39 in the English Channel. On the night of 14/15 May while UB-12 was on the surface, Steindorff noted a large underwater explosion some miles away in a British minefield, and when UB-39 failed to return to Zeebrugge, one of the bases for the Flanders Flotilla, reported what was likely the demise of UB-39 at the hands of a British mine.

April found two more victims added to UB-12's tally. On the 20th, Nepaulin, another British auxiliary minesweeper was lost on one of UB-12's mines near the Dyck Lightvessel. Six days later, the British steamer Alhama was mined while loaded with pit props destined for Dunkirk. The 1,744 GRT cargo ship was the largest ship sunk by UB-12 since the Silksworth Hall, sunk the previous April. UB-12 sank another two ships under Steindorff's command, one each in June and July. The steamer Dulwich—carrying coal from Seaham for London—was mined and sunk with the loss of five men on 10 June. One month later, the French patrol vessel Jupiter I was mined off Calais. These were the last two ships credited to mines from UB-12 for the next fourteen months.

== Fate ==
UB-12's activities over the next year are not well documented, and no specific record of her can be found in English-language sources. However, it is known that during this period, she was helmed by four different commanders, with the final officer, Oblt. Ernst Schöller, assuming command in May 1918. Under Schöller's command, UB-12 departed Zeebrugge on 19 August to lay mines in the Downs off the Kentish coast, but never returned. According to one British source, UB-12 was herself mined off Helgoland sometime in August. Author Dwight Messimer considers this unlikely given that Helgoland is nowhere near the route that UB-12 could have taken to get to the Downs. A postwar German study concluded the two most likely fates for UB-12 were that she either struck a British mine or was destroyed by one of her own mines that malfunctioned during deployment. Messimer also considers it possible that UB-12 may have had a diving accident related to her conversion to a minelayer.

Some two months after UB-12's presumed loss, she was credited with the sinking of her final ship. On 27 October, two weeks before the end of the war, the 92 GRT British ship Calceolaria struck one of UB-12's mines near the Elbow Lightvessel and sank.

== Summary of raiding history ==
Ships sunk or damaged by SM UB-12
Date	Name	Nationality	Tonnage (Note: Merchant ship tonnages are in gross register tons. Military vessels are listed by tons displacement)	Fate
24 July 1915	Activity	United Kingdom	56	Sunk
24 July 1915	Henry Charles	United Kingdom	41	Sunk
24 July 1915	Kathleen	United Kingdom	59	Sunk
24 July 1915	Prosper	United Kingdom	45	Sunk
4 August 1915	Challenger	United Kingdom	50	Sunk
4 August 1915	Heliotrope	United Kingdom	28	Sunk
23 August 1915	Boy Bert	United Kingdom	57	Sunk
23 August 1915	Integrity	United Kingdom	52	Sunk
25 August 1915	Young Frank	United Kingdom	49	Sunk
21 February 1916	La Petite Henriette	Belgium	92	Sunk
21 February 1916	Oleander	United Kingdom	34	Sunk
21 February 1916	W.E. Brown	United Kingdom	58	Sunk
10 April 1916	Silksworth Hall	United Kingdom	4,777	Sunk
6 September 1916	Rilda	Norway	313	Sunk
7 September 1916	Niobe	Netherlands	654	Captured as prize
28 September 1916	Marjorie	United Kingdom	55	Sunk
13 March 1917	Elisabeth	French Navy	302	Sunk
18 March 1917	HMS Duchess of Montrose	Royal Navy	322	Sunk
23 March 1917	HMS Laforey	Royal Navy	995	Sunk
20 April 1917	HMS Nepaulin	Royal Navy	314	Sunk
26 April 1917	Alhama	United Kingdom	1,744	Sunk
10 June 1917	Dulwich	United Kingdom	1,460	Sunk
10 July 1917	Jupiter I	French Navy	263	Sunk
27 October 1918	HMT Calceolaria	Royal Navy	92	Sunk
		Total:	11,912	

== Bibliography ==
- Bendert, Harald (2000). Die UB-Boote der Kaiserlichen Marine, 1914-1918. Einsätze, Erfolge, Schicksal (in German). Hamburg: Verlag E.S. Mittler & Sohn GmbH. ISBN 3-8132-0713-7.
- Bridgland, Tony (1999). Sea Killers in Disguise: The Story of the Q-ships and Decoy Ships in the First World War. Annapolis, Maryland: Naval Institute Press. ISBN 978-1-55750-895-9. OCLC 42640050.
- Gardiner, Robert; Gray, Randal, eds. (1985). Conway's All the World's Fighting Ships 1906–1921. Annapolis, Maryland: Naval Institute Press. ISBN 978-0-87021-907-8. OCLC 12119866.
- Gibson, R. H.; Maurice Prendergast (2003) [1931]. The German Submarine War, 1914–1918. Annapolis, Maryland: Naval Institute Press. ISBN 9781591143147. OCLC 52924732.
- Grant, Robert M. (2003). U-boat Hunters: Code Breakers, Divers and the Defeat of the U-boats, 1914–1918. Annapolis, Maryland: Naval Institute Press. ISBN 978-1-59114-889-0. OCLC 54688427.
- Gröner, Erich; Jung, Dieter; Maass, Martin (1991). U-boats and Mine Warfare Vessels. German Warships 1815–1945. Vol. 2. Translated by Thomas, Keith; Magowan, Rachel. London: Conway Maritime Press. ISBN 0-85177-593-4.
- Karau, Mark D. (2003). Wielding the Dagger: the MarineKorps Flandern and the German War Effort, 1914–1918. Westport, Connecticut: Praeger. ISBN 978-0-313-32475-8. OCLC 51204317.
- McCartney, Innes (2003). Lost Patrols: Submarine Wrecks of the English Channel. Penzance: Periscope. ISBN 978-1-904381-04-4. OCLC 224045134.
- Messimer, Dwight R. (2002). Verschollen: World War I U-boat Losses. Annapolis, Maryland: Naval Institute Press. ISBN 978-1-55750-475-3. OCLC 231973419.
- Miller, David (2002). The Illustrated Directory of Submarines of the World. St. Paul, Minnesota: MBI Pub. Co. ISBN 978-0-7603-1345-9. OCLC 50208951.
- Tarrant, V. E. (1989). The U-Boat Offensive: 1914–1945. Annapolis, Maryland: Naval Institute Press. ISBN 978-0-87021-764-7. OCLC 20338385.
- Tennent, A. J. (2006) [1990]. British Merchant Ships Sunk by U boats in the 1914–1918 War. Penzance: Periscope Publishing. ISBN 1-904381-36-7.
- Williamson, Gordon (2002). U-boats of the Kaiser's Navy. Oxford: Osprey. ISBN 978-1-84176-362-0. OCLC 48627495.
