= PS Duchess of Montrose =

Clyde-built paddle steamer (1902–1917)

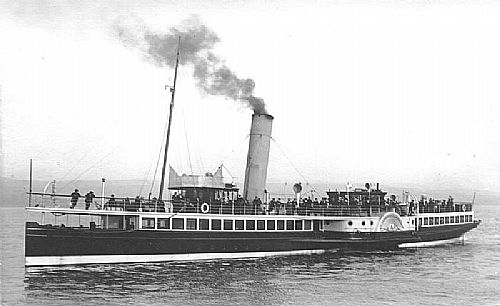
- Paddle Steamer Duchess of Montrose in pre-war livery

History

United Kingdom
- Name: PS Duchess of Montrose
- Namesake: Violet Hermione Graham (1854-1940), Duchess of Montrose
- Owner: (United Kingdom) Caledonian Steam Packet Company
- Ordered: 29 November 1901
- Builder: John Brown & Company, Clydebank
- Cost: £19,572
- Yard number: 352
- Laid down: 19 December 1901
- Launched: 8 May 1902
- Fate: Requisitioned by the Royal Navy, 15 February 1915

United Kingdom
- Operator: Royal Navy
- Acquired: 15 February 1915
- Identification: Pennant number: PP585
- Fate: Mined near Gravelines, 18 March 1917

General characteristics
- Class & type: Clyde paddle steamer
- Tonnage: 322 tons
- Length: 210.3 ft (64.1 m)
- Beam: 25.2 ft (7.7 m)
- Installed power: 206 nominal horsepower
- Propulsion: Four-cylinder triple-expansion diagonal steam engine, driving paddles
- Speed: 16.5 kn (30.6 km/h)

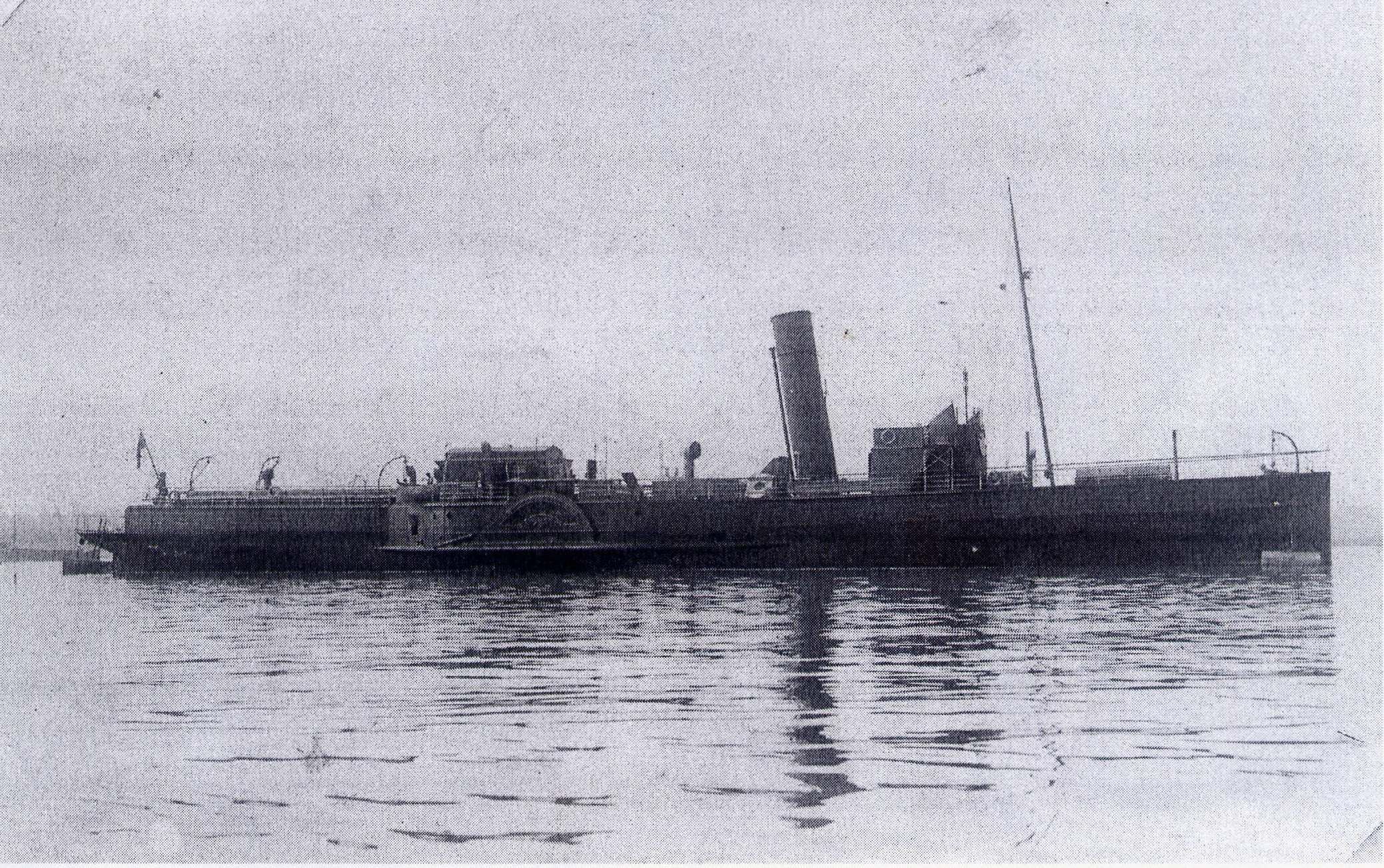
Duchess of Montrose during the First World War (Picture taken sometime between February and May 1915)

PS Duchess of Montrose was a paddle steamer launched in 1902 and operated by the Caledonian Steam Packet Company as a River Clyde excursion steamer. She saw active service during the First World War after being requisitioned by the Admiralty and converted into a minesweeper. She was lost near Dunkirk on 18 March 1917 after striking a mine.

== Construction ==
In October 1901 the Caledonian Steam Packet Company invited tenders from six of the Clyde shipyards to build a replacement for the paddle steamer Meg Merrilies. On 29 October 1901 they accepted an offer made by John Brown & Company of Clydebank to build the ship for £19,572, and the keel was laid in Clydebank on 19 December 1901. The minutes of the Caledonian Steam Packet Company for 4 February 1902 record that:

It was agreed, subject of the approval of Her Grace, the Duchess of Montrose, that the new steamer should be named Duchess of Montrose.

Duchess of Montrose was launched on 8 May 1902 and achieved the contracted speed during trials on 4 June 1902.

== Design ==
Duchess of Montrose was fitted with a triple-expansion steam engine incorporating four cylinders (two high-, one intermediate-, and one low-pressure) arranged in tandem to drive two cranks. This arrangement was considered more efficient than the conventional two-cylinder compound steam engine and provided greater manoeuvrability at piers. The use of relatively small paddle wheels, intended to save wear and tear, meant that Duchess of Montrose had a diminutive paddlebox and, in conjunction with a very vertical funnel, she was easily recognisable amongst the Clyde fleet. She featured saloons fore and aft and an open bow under the promenade deck.

== Career ==
=== Excursion steamer ===
Initially employed on the Ayr station, she went on to service both the Gourock and Wemyss Bay routes before being used for general railway connections further upstream.

=== Troopship ===
On 15 February 1915, along with Duchess of Argyll and Duchess of Hamilton, she was requisitioned by the Admiralty as a troopship and spent the first few months of her service ferrying troops from Southampton to France. It is reported that she initially arrived in Southampton in her Caledonian Steam Packet livery but was soon repainted naval grey.

=== Minesweeper ===
On 15 May 1915 she was given the pennant number PP585 and converted into a minesweeper by Lieutenant Commander W G Rigg. This work involved having the end of her saloon cut away to main deck level and replaced with minesweeping equipment. From 14 July 1915 she was stationed at Dover under the command of Lieutenant Alexander Duff Thomson Royal Naval Reserve and from April 1916 she was stationed at Dunkirk.

== Salvage of the Sussex ==
Between 1 and 3 January 1917, Duchess of Montrose, HMS Myrmidon, HMS Nepaulin, HMS Redcar, HMT Security assisted in the salvage of the steamer SS Sussex after she struck a mine near the West Dyck shoal on her way to Dunkirk from Sydney, each ship receiving a portion of the salvage money.

== Loss ==
On the morning of Sunday 18 March 1917, Duchess of Montrose left Dunkirk harbour and at 9am began sweeping close to the Gravelines Buoy. She recovered five mines (from Barrage 248 laid by the U-Boat UB-12) before stopping for low water. Around an hour after she resumed sweeping, Duchess of Montrose hit a mine amidships, broke in two and sank in less than a minute. Her wreck lies at 51°03′N 2°07′E

Thirty-one of the crew of Duchess of Montrose are reported to have been rescued, but twelve men were lost in the sinking.
