= SM U-24 =

German submarine of World War I

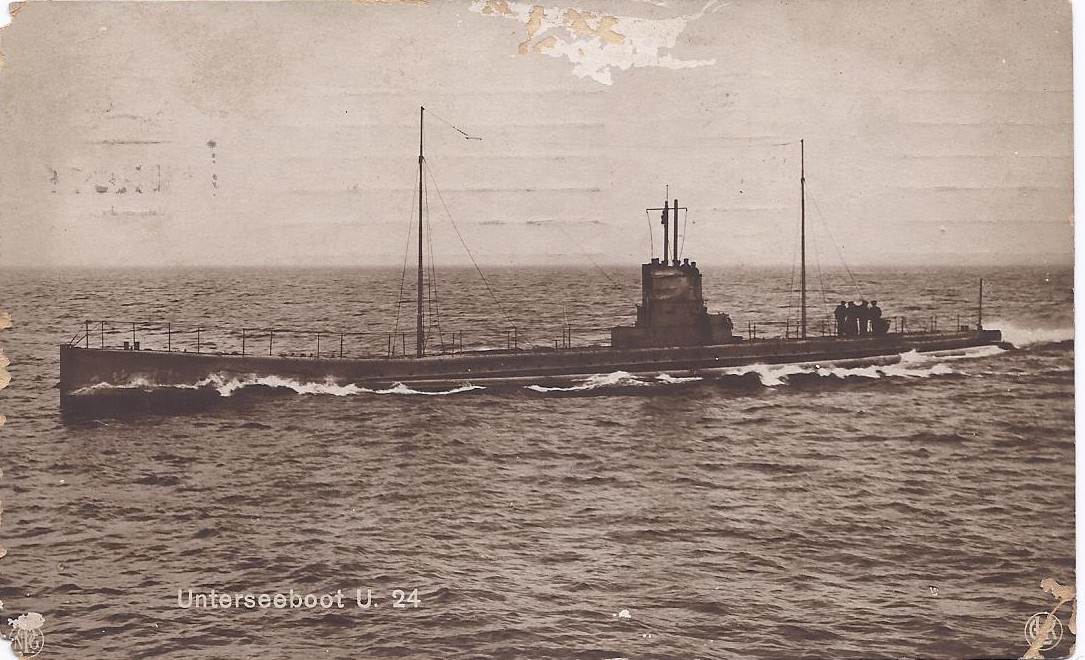

History

German Empire
- Name: U-24
- Ordered: 18 March 1911
- Builder: Germaniawerft, Kiel
- Yard number: 178
- Laid down: 5 February 1912
- Launched: 24 May 1913
- Commissioned: 6 December 1913
- Fate: Surrendered, 22 November 1918; Broken up, 1922

General characteristics
- Class & type: Type U 23 submarine
- Displacement: 669 t (658 long tons) surfaced; 864 t (850 long tons) submerged
- Length: 64.70 m (212.3 ft)
- Beam: 6.32 m (20 ft 9 in)
- Draught: 3.45 m (11 ft 4 in)
- Propulsion: 2 shafts; 2 × Germania 6-cylinder two stroke diesel motors with 1,800 PS (1,320 kW; 1,780 shp); 2 × SSW double Motordynamos with 1,200 PS (880 kW; 1,180 shp); 450 rpm surfaced; 330 rpm submerged
- Speed: 16.7 knots (30.9 km/h; 19.2 mph) surfaced; 10.3 knots (19.1 km/h; 11.9 mph) submerged
- Range: 9,910 nmi (18,350 km; 11,400 mi) at 8 knots (15 km/h; 9.2 mph) surfaced; 85 nmi (157 km; 98 mi) at 5 knots (9.3 km/h; 5.8 mph) submerged
- Test depth: about 50 m (160 ft)
- Boats & landing craft carried: 1 dinghy
- Complement: 4 officers, 31 men
- Armament: 4 × 50 cm (19.7 in) torpedo tubes (2 each bow and stern); 6 torpedoes; 1 × 8.8 cm (3.5 in) SK L/30 gun

Service record
- Part of: III Flotilla; 1 August 1914 – 11 August 1917; Training Flotilla; 24 August 1917 – 11 November 1918
- Commanders: Kptlt. Rudolf Schneider; 6 December 1913 – 3 June 1916; Kptlt. Walter Remy; 4 June 1916 – 10 July 1917; Kptlt. Otto von Schubert; 11 July – 1 August 1917
- Operations: 7 patrols
- Victories: 33 merchant ships sunk (105,948 GRT); 1 warship sunk (15,000 tons); 1 auxiliary warship sunk (174 GRT); 3 merchant ships damaged (14,318 GRT); 1 merchant ship taken as prize (1,925 GRT)

SM U-24 was one of 329 submarines serving in the Imperial German Navy in World War I. She was engaged in commerce warfare during the First Battle of the Atlantic.

In seven patrols, U-24 sank a total of 33 merchant ships and 1 auxiliary warship totalling 106,122 GRT and one warship for 15,000 tons, damaged three merchant ships for 14,318 GRT, and took one merchant ship as prize of 1,925 GRT.

Her second kill was the most significant. The victim was HMS Formidable, torpedoed 30 nautical miles (56 km; 35 mi) south of Lyme Regis, at 50°13′N 03°04′W. She was hit in the number one boiler room on the port side. Out of a crew of approximately 711 men, 547 died as a result. This was one of the largest ships sunk by U-boats during the war.

In 1915, U-24 claimed another noted victim, the passenger steamer Arabic, causing 44 deaths, including three Americans. Arabic sank in 10 minutes. This escalated the U-boat fear in the U.S. and caused a diplomatic incident which resulted in the suspension of torpedoing non-military ships without notice.

== Summary of raiding history ==
Date	Name	Nationality	Tonnage (Note: Merchant ship tonnages are in gross register tons. Military vessels are listed by tons displacement.)	Fate
26 October 1914	Amiral Ganteaume	France	4,590	Damaged
1 January 1915	HMS Formidable	Royal Navy	15,000	Sunk
2 April 1915	Lochwood	United Kingdom	2,042	Sunk
4 April 1915	City of Bremen	United Kingdom	1,258	Sunk
10 April 1915	The President	United Kingdom	647	Sunk
11 April 1915	Frederic Franck	France	973	Damaged
27 June 1915	Edith	United Kingdom	97	Sunk
27 June 1915	Indrani	United Kingdom	3,640	Sunk
27 June 1915	Lucena	United Kingdom	243	Sunk
28 June 1915	Dumfriesshire	United Kingdom	2,622	Sunk
28 June 1915	Armenian	United Kingdom	8,825	Sunk
30 June 1915	Scottish Monarch	United Kingdom	5,043	Sunk
30 June 1915	Thistlebank	Norway	2,411	Sunk
1 July 1915	L. C. Tower	United Kingdom	518	Sunk
1 July 1915	Sardomene	Italy	2,000	Sunk
1 July 1915	Welbury	United Kingdom	3,591	Sunk
6 July 1915	Ellen	Denmark	169	Sunk
7 August 1915	Geiranger	Norway	1,081	Sunk
12 August 1915	Osprey	United Kingdom	310	Sunk
13 August 1915	Cairo	United Kingdom	1,671	Sunk
19 August 1915	Arabic	United Kingdom	15,801	Sunk
19 August 1915	Dunsley	United Kingdom	4,930	Sunk
19 August 1915	New York City	United Kingdom	2,970	Sunk
19 August 1915	St. Olaf	United Kingdom	277	Sunk
24 August 1915	Sinsen	Norway	1,925	Captured as prize
25 December 1915	Van Stirum	United Kingdom	3,284	Sunk
26 December 1915	Cottingham	United Kingdom	513	Sunk
26 December 1915	Ministre Bernaert	Belgium	4,215	Sunk
28 December 1915	Huronian	United Kingdom	8,755	Damaged
28 December 1915	El Zorro	United Kingdom	5,989	Sunk
11 July 1916	HMT Nellie Nutten	Royal Navy	174	Sunk
30 October 1916	Nellie Bruce	United Kingdom	192	Sunk
10 December 1916	Agder	Norway	305	Sunk
21 March 1917	Stanley	United Kingdom	3,987	Sunk
22 March 1917	Svendsholm	Norway	1,998	Sunk
27 March 1917	Glenogle	United Kingdom	7,682	Sunk
28 March 1917	Cannizaro	United Kingdom	6,133	Sunk
18 June 1917	Elele	United Kingdom	6,557	Sunk
18 June 1917	English Monarch	United Kingdom	4,947	Sunk
