= SM UB-17 =

German Type UB I-class submarine

History

German Empire
- Name: UB-17
- Ordered: 25 November 1914
- Builder: AG Weser, Bremen
- Yard number: 226
- Laid down: 21 February 1915
- Launched: 21 April 1915
- Commissioned: 4 May 1915
- Fate: Disappeared after 11 March 1918 Found in July 2013

General characteristics
- Class & type: Type UB I submarine
- Displacement: 127 t (125 long tons) surfaced; 141 t (139 long tons) submerged
- Length: 27.88 m (91 ft 6 in) (o/a)
- Beam: 3.15 m (10 ft 4 in)
- Draft: 3.03 m (9 ft 11 in)
- Propulsion: 1 × propeller shaft; 1 × Körting 4-cylinder diesel engine, 59 bhp (44 kW); 1 × Siemens-Schuckert electric motor, 119 shp (89 kW)
- Speed: 7.45 knots (13.80 km/h; 8.57 mph) surfaced; 6.24 knots (11.56 km/h; 7.18 mph) submerged
- Range: 1,500 nmi (2,800 km; 1,700 mi) at 5 knots (9.3 km/h; 5.8 mph); 45 nmi (83 km; 52 mi) at 4 knots (7.4 km/h; 4.6 mph)
- Test depth: 50 metres (160 ft)
- Complement: 14
- Armament: 2 × 45 cm (17.7 in) bow torpedo tubes; 2 × torpedoes; 1 × 8 mm (0.31 in) machine gun
- Notes: 33-second diving time

Service record
- Part of: Flanders Flotilla; 10 May 1915 – 15 March 1918
- Commanders: Oblt. Ralph Wenninger; 4 May 1915 – 6 February 1916; Oblt. Arthur Metz; 7 February – 9 March 1916; Oblt. Werner Fürbringer; 10–16 March 1916; Oblt. Friedrich Moecke; 17 March – 15 April 1916; Oblt. Ralph Wenninger; 16 April – 27 June 1916; Oblt. Günther Suadicani; 28 June – 7 July 1916; Oblt. Hans Degetau; 8 July – 3 December 1916; Oblt. Ulrich Meier; 4 December 1916 – 17 July 1917; Oblt. Georg Niemeyer; 18 July – 23 September 1917; Oblt. Günther Wigankow; 24–30 September 1917; Oblt. Johannes Ries; 1 October 1917 – 9 January 1918; Oblt. Albert Branscheid; 10 January – 15 March 1918
- Operations: 91 patrols
- Victories: 11 merchant ships sunk (1,812 GRT); 2 auxiliary warships sunk (374 GRT); 1 merchant ship damaged (4,054 GRT); 2 merchant ships taken as prize (316 GRT + Unknown GRT)

SM UB-17 was a German Type UB I submarine or U-boat in the German Imperial Navy (German: Kaiserliche Marine) during World War I. The submarine disappeared during a patrol in March 1918.

UB-17 was ordered in November 1914 and was laid down at the AG Weser shipyard in Bremen in February 1915. UB-17 was a little under 28 metres (92 ft) in length and displaced between 127 and 141 tonnes (125 and 139 long tons), depending on whether surfaced or submerged. She carried two torpedoes for her two bow torpedo tubes and was also armed with a deck-mounted machine gun. UB-17 was broken into sections and shipped by rail to Antwerp for reassembly. She was launched in April 1915 and commissioned as SM UB-17 in May. (Note: "SM" stands for "Seiner Majestät" (English: His Majesty's) and combined with the U for Unterseeboot would be translated as His Majesty's Submarine.)

UB-17 spent her entire career in the Flanders Flotilla and sank 13 ships, most of them British fishing vessels. She also captured two ships as prizes and damaged one tanker. On 11 March 1918, UB-17 departed for a patrol in the Hoofden but was never seen again. There have been several suggestions as to UB-17's fate, but none match the U-boat's operation details.

In July 2013, UB-17 was found off England's east coast, near the county of Suffolk by archaeologists.

== Design and construction ==
After the German Army's rapid advance along the North Sea coast in the earliest stages of World War I, the German Imperial Navy found itself without suitable submarines that could be operated in the narrow and shallow seas off Flanders. Project 34, a design effort begun in mid-August 1914, produced the Type UB I design: a small submarine that could be shipped by rail to a port of operations and quickly assembled. Constrained by railroad size limitations, the UB I design called for a boat about 28 metres (92 ft) long and displacing about 125 tonnes (123 long tons) with two torpedo tubes. (Note: A further refinement of the design—replacing the torpedo tubes with mine chutes but changing little else—evolved into the Type UC I coastal minelaying submarine. See: Miller, p. 458.)

UB-17 and sister boat UB-16 comprised an order of two submarines ordered on 25 November from AG Weser of Bremen, a little more than three months after planning for the class began. UB-17 was laid down by Weser in Bremen on 21 February 1915. As built, UB-17 was 27.88 metres (91 ft 6 in) long, 3.15 metres (10 ft 4 in) abeam, and had a draft of 3.03 metres (9 ft 11 in). She had a single 59-brake-horsepower (44 kW) Körting 4-cylinder diesel engine for surface travel, and a single 119-shaft-horsepower (89 kW) Siemens-Schuckert electric motor for underwater travel, both attached to a single propeller shaft. Her top speeds were 7.45 knots (13.80 km/h; 8.57 mph), surfaced, and 6.24 knots (11.56 km/h; 7.18 mph), submerged. At more moderate speeds, she could sail up to 1,500 nautical miles (2,800 km; 1,700 mi) on the surface before refueling, and up to 45 nautical miles (83 km; 52 mi) submerged before recharging her batteries. Like all boats of the class, UB-17 was rated to a diving depth of 50 metres (160 ft), and could completely submerge in 33 seconds.

UB-17 was armed with two 45-centimeter (17.7 in) torpedoes in two bow torpedo tubes. She was also outfitted for a single 8-millimeter (0.31 in) machine gun on deck. UB-17's standard complement consisted of one officer and thirteen enlisted men.

After work on UB-17 was complete at the Weser yard, she was readied for rail shipment. The process of shipping a UB I boat involved breaking the submarine down into what was essentially a knock down kit. Each boat was broken into approximately fifteen pieces and loaded onto eight railway flatcars. In early 1915, the sections of UB-17 were shipped to Antwerp for assembly in what was typically a two- to three-week process. After UB-17 was assembled and launched on 21 April, she was loaded on a barge and taken through canals to Bruges where she underwent trials.

== Early career ==
The submarine was commissioned into the German Imperial Navy as SM UB-17 on 4 May 1915 under the command of Kapitänleutnant (Kapt.) Ralph Wenninger, a 25-year-old former skipper of UB-11. (Note: Wenninger was in the Navy's April 1907 cadet class with 34 other future U-boat captains, including Werner Fürbringer, Heino von Heimburg, Hans Howaldt, and Otto Steinbrinck. See: Helgason, Guðmundur. "WWI Officer Crews: Crew 4/07". German and Austrian U-boats of World War I - Kaiserliche Marine - Uboat.net.) On 10 May, UB-17 joined the Flanders Flotilla (German: U-boote des Marinekorps U-Flotille Flandern), which had been organized on 29 March. When UB-17 joined the flotilla, Germany was in the midst of its first submarine offensive, begun in February. During this campaign, enemy vessels in the German-defined war zone (German: Kriegsgebiet), which encompassed all waters around the United Kingdom, were to be sunk. Vessels of neutral countries were not to be attacked unless they definitively could be identified as enemy vessels operating under a false flag.

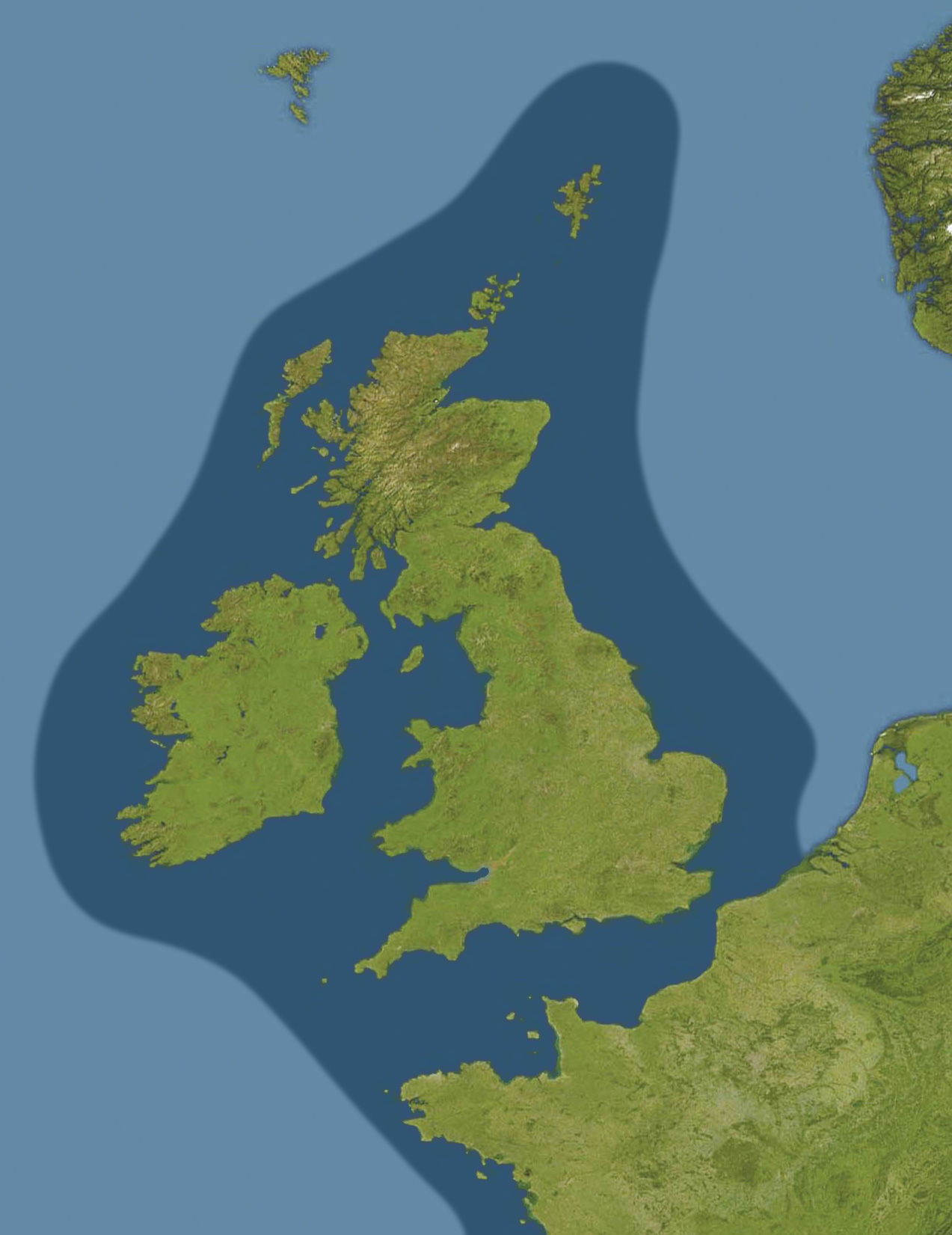
The German war zone (German: Kriegsgebiet) for the first submarine offensive.

On 18 July, Wenninger torpedoed the British tanker Batoum just off the Southwold lighthouse. Despite the loss of six men, Batoum's crew was able to beach the ship, listed as 4,054 gross register tons (GRT). (Note: After Batoum was refloated, repaired, and re-entered service, she was torpedoed and sunk by U-61 in June 1917.) Early the next month, on 6 August, Wenninger and UB-17 sank four British fishing vessels while patrolling in the Yarmouth–Lowestoft area. All four of the sunken ships were smacks—sailing vessels traditionally rigged with red ochre sails—which were stopped, boarded by crewmen from UB-17, and sunk with explosives.

On 18 August, the chief of the Admiralstab, Admiral Henning von Holtzendorff, issued orders suspending the first offensive in response to American demands after German submarines had sunk the Cunard Line steamer Lusitania in May 1915 and other high-profile sinkings in August and September. Holtzendorff's directive ordered all U-boats out of the English Channel and the South-Western Approaches and required that all submarine activity in the North Sea be conducted strictly along prize regulations. Six days later, UB-17 seized the Belgian sailing vessel Leon Mathilde as a prize off Ostend.

Enemy naval targets were not subject to the prize regulations, so on 23 September, Wenninger torpedoed and sank the Saint Pierre I, a trawler of the French Navy off the Dyck lightship. There was only one survivor from the 303 GRT ship's eighteen-man crew. Three months later, Wenninger misidentified the 71 GRT French fishing ship Jesus Maria as a destroyer. UB-17 launched a torpedo which struck the ship and killed all six men of Jesus Maria's crew.

On 31 January 1916, in the Lowestoft–Aldeburgh area, UB-17 sank an additional four fishing ships: three British, and one Belgian. The next day, UB-17's war journal (German: Kriegstagebücher or KTB) records the torpedoing of the 957 GRT British steamer Franz Fischer off the Kentish Knock. British records list the cargo ship as being sunk by bombs from a zeppelin. Franz Fischer was the last ship sunk with Wenninger in command. On 7 February, he was relieved by Oberleutnant zur See (Oblt.) Arthur Metz for a month, Kapt. Werner Fürbringer for a week, and Oblt. Friedrich Moecke for another month. Wenninger resumed command on 16 April.

In the meantime, Germany had begun its second submarine offensive against merchant shipping at the end of February in reaction to the British blockade of Germany. By early 1916, the British blockade was having an effect on Germany and her imports. The Royal Navy had stopped and seized more cargo destined for Germany than the quantity of cargo sunk by German U-boats in the first submarine offensive. UB-17 sank no ships during this offensive, which was called off near the end of April by Admiral Reinhardt Scheer, the commander-in-chief of the High Seas Fleet.

== Grand Fleet ambush attempts ==
In mid-May, Scheer completed plans to draw out part of the British Grand Fleet. The German High Seas Fleet would sortie for a raid on Sunderland, luring the British fleet across "'nests' of submarines and mine-fields". In support of the operation, UB-17 and five other Flanders boats set out at midnight 30/31 May to form a line 18 nautical miles (33 km; 21 mi) east of Lowestoft. (Note: The other five boats for the May action were UB-6, UB-10, UB-12, UB-16, and UB-29.) This group was to intercept and attack the British light forces from Harwich, should they sortie north to join the battle. Unfortunately for the Germans, the British Admiralty had intelligence reports of the departure of the submarines which, coupled with an absence of attacks on shipping, aroused British suspicions.

A delayed departure of the German High Seas Fleet for its sortie (which had been redirected to the Skagerrak) and the failure of several of the U-boats stationed to the north to receive the coded message warning of the British advance caused Scheer's anticipated ambush to be a "complete and disappointing failure". In UB-16's group, only UB-10 sighted the Harwich forces, and they were too far away to mount an attack. The failure of the submarine ambush to sink any British capital ships allowed the full Grand Fleet to engage the numerically inferior High Seas Fleet in the Battle of Jutland, which took place 31 May – 1 June.

Wenninger left UB-17 for good on 27 June and was succeeded by Kapt. Günther Suadicani, who commanded the boat for just under two weeks. He was followed by Oblt. Hans Degetau, who commanded the boat from July to December. Under Degetau's leadership, UB-17 added another ship to her tally when she captured and sank the Dutch ship Zeearend on 1 September. The 462 GRT steamer was en route to London from Rotterdam with a cargo of piece goods when she was sunk 19 nautical miles (35 km; 22 mi) from the Mass Lightship. UB-17's next success was the capture of the Norwegian steamer Birgit in the Hoofden area under the command of Kapt. Ulrich Meier, who had taken command on 4 December. Birgit was the last success for UB-17 for the next twelve months.

== Conversion to minelayer ==
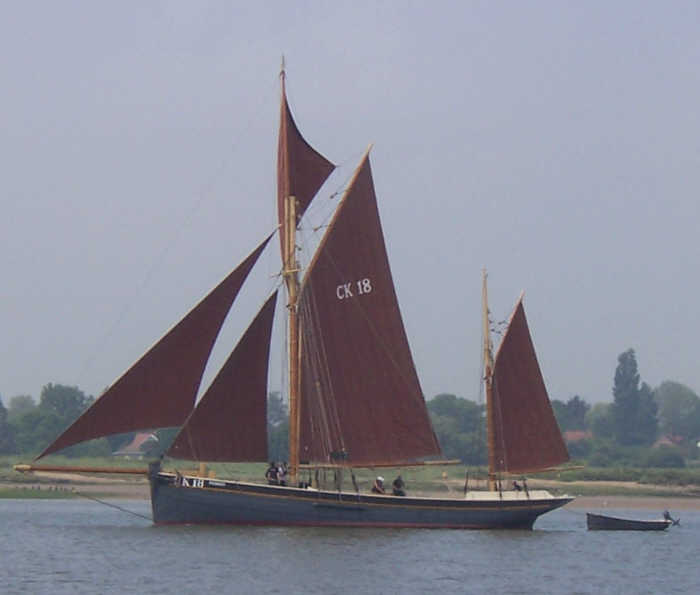
Ten of UB-17's sixteen victims were fishing smacks, traditionally outfitted with red ochre sails, like this contemporary smack.

UB-17 and three sister boats, UB-10, UB-12, and UB-16, were all converted to minelaying submarines by 1918. The conversion involved removing the bow section containing the pair of torpedo tubes from each U-boat and replacing it with a new bow containing four mine chutes capable of carrying two mines each. In the process, the boats were lengthened to 105 feet (32 m), and the displacement increased to 147 tonnes (145 long tons) on the surface, and 161 tonnes (158 long tons) below the surface. Exactly when this conversion was performed on UB-17 is not reported, but UB-17 was at the dockyard from November 1916 to January 1917, and it is possible UB-17 was converted during this same timeframe.

While Meier remained in command of UB-17, Kaiser Wilhelm II personally approved a resumption of unrestricted submarine warfare to begin on 1 February 1917 to help force the British to make peace. Although the new rules of engagement specified that no ship was to be left afloat, UB-17 did not contribute to the effort until December 1917, when she captured and sank a single fishing smack off Aldeburgh under the direction of Oblt. Johannes Ries. In January 1918, Ries was replaced by Oblt. Albert Branscheid.

== Sinking ==
On 11 March 1918, Branscheid led UB-17 out from Zeebrugge for a patrol in the Hoofden and the U-boat was never seen again. One postwar account tells of two British seaplanes that bombed a U-boat in the North Sea on 12 March, but, according to author Dwight Messimer, the account provides no details to support the claim. Messimer also discounts an account that attributes UB-17's sinking to British destroyer Onslow on 25 February south of Portland by pointing out that UB-17 was in port in Zeebrugge on that date. A German postwar study also rejected a British claim that destroyers HMS Thruster, Retriever, and Sturgeon sank UB-17 at 21:25 on 11 March at position 57°7′N 2°43′E because UB-17 didn't depart Zeebrugge until 30 minutes after the attack took place. Whatever the specific cause of UB-17's demise, all eighteen crewmen on board the submarine were killed.

== Discovery ==
In July 2013, archaeologists found the remains of 44 submarines, including UB-17, off the United Kingdom's southern and east coasts, near the county of Suffolk. The find was made up mostly of vessels from the German Imperial Navy dating to World War I. Der Spiegel reported divers located 41 German U-boats, and three of English submarines, found at depths of up to 50 feet, off England's southern and eastern coasts.

== Summary of raiding history ==
Ships sunk or damaged by SM UB-17
Date	Name	Nationality	Tonnage (Note: Merchant ship tonnages are in gross register tons. Military vessels are listed by tons displacement)	Fate
18 July 1915	Batoum	United Kingdom	4,054	Damaged
6 August 1915	C.E.S.	United Kingdom	47	Sunk
6 August 1915	Fisherman	United Kingdom	24	Sunk
6 August 1915	Hesperus	United Kingdom	47	Sunk
6 August 1915	Ivan	United Kingdom	44	Sunk
24 August 1915	Leon Mathilde	Belgium	Unknown	Captured as prize
23 September 1915	Saint Pierre I	French Navy	303	Sunk
9 November 1915	Jesus Maria	French Navy	71	Sunk
31 January 1916	Artur Wilhelm	United Kingdom	56	Sunk
31 January 1916	Hilda	United Kingdom	44	Sunk
31 January 1916	Marguerite	Belgium	32	Sunk
31 January 1916	Radium	United Kingdom	59	Sunk
1 February 1916	Franz Fischer	United Kingdom	957	Sunk
1 September 1916	Zeearend	Netherlands	462	Sunk
15 December 1916	Birgit	Norway	316	Captured as prize
10 December 1917	Forward	United Kingdom	40	Sunk
		(Note: Tonnage of ships captured as prizes is included in tonnage sunk.)Sunk: Damaged: Total:	2,502; 4,054; 6,556	

== Bibliography ==
- Bendert, Harald (2000). Die UB-Boote der Kaiserlichen Marine, 1914-1918. Einsätze, Erfolge, Schicksal (in German). Hamburg: Verlag E.S. Mittler & Sohn GmbH. ISBN 3-8132-0713-7.
- Gröner, Erich; Jung, Dieter; Maass, Martin (1991). U-boats and Mine Warfare Vessels. German Warships 1815–1945. Vol. 2. Translated by Thomas, Keith; Magowan, Rachel. London: Conway Maritime Press. ISBN 0-85177-593-4.
- Compton-Hall, Richard (2004) [1991]. Submarines at War, 1914–18. Penzance: Periscope Publishing. ISBN 978-1-904381-21-1. OCLC 57639764.
- Gardiner, Robert; Gray, Randal, eds. (1985). Conway's All the World's Fighting Ships 1906–1921. Annapolis, Maryland: Naval Institute Press. ISBN 978-0-87021-907-8. OCLC 12119866.
- Gibson, R. H.; Maurice Prendergast (2003) [1931]. The German Submarine War, 1914–1918. Annapolis, Maryland: Naval Institute Press. ISBN 9781591143147. OCLC 52924732.
- Grant, Robert M. (2003). U-boat Hunters: Code Breakers, Divers and the Defeat of the U-boats, 1914–1918. Annapolis, Maryland: Naval Institute Press. ISBN 978-1-59114-889-0. OCLC 54688427.
- Karau, Mark D. (2003). Wielding the Dagger: the MarineKorps Flandern and the German War Effort, 1914–1918. Westport, Connecticut: Praeger. ISBN 978-0-313-32475-8. OCLC 51204317.
- Messimer, Dwight R. (2002). Verschollen: World War I U-boat losses. Annapolis, Maryland: Naval Institute Press. ISBN 978-1-55750-475-3. OCLC 231973419.
- Miller, David (2002). The Illustrated Directory of Submarines of the World. St. Paul, Minnesota: MBI Pub. Co. ISBN 978-0-7603-1345-9. OCLC 50208951.
- Tarrant, V. E. (1989). The U-Boat Offensive: 1914–1945. Annapolis, Maryland: Naval Institute Press. ISBN 9781854095206. OCLC 20338385.
- Williamson, Gordon (2002). U-boats of the Kaiser's Navy. Oxford: Osprey. ISBN 978-1-84176-362-0. OCLC 48627495.
