= SS Onondaga (1905) =

Coordinates: 41°17′46″N 71°51′55.2″W

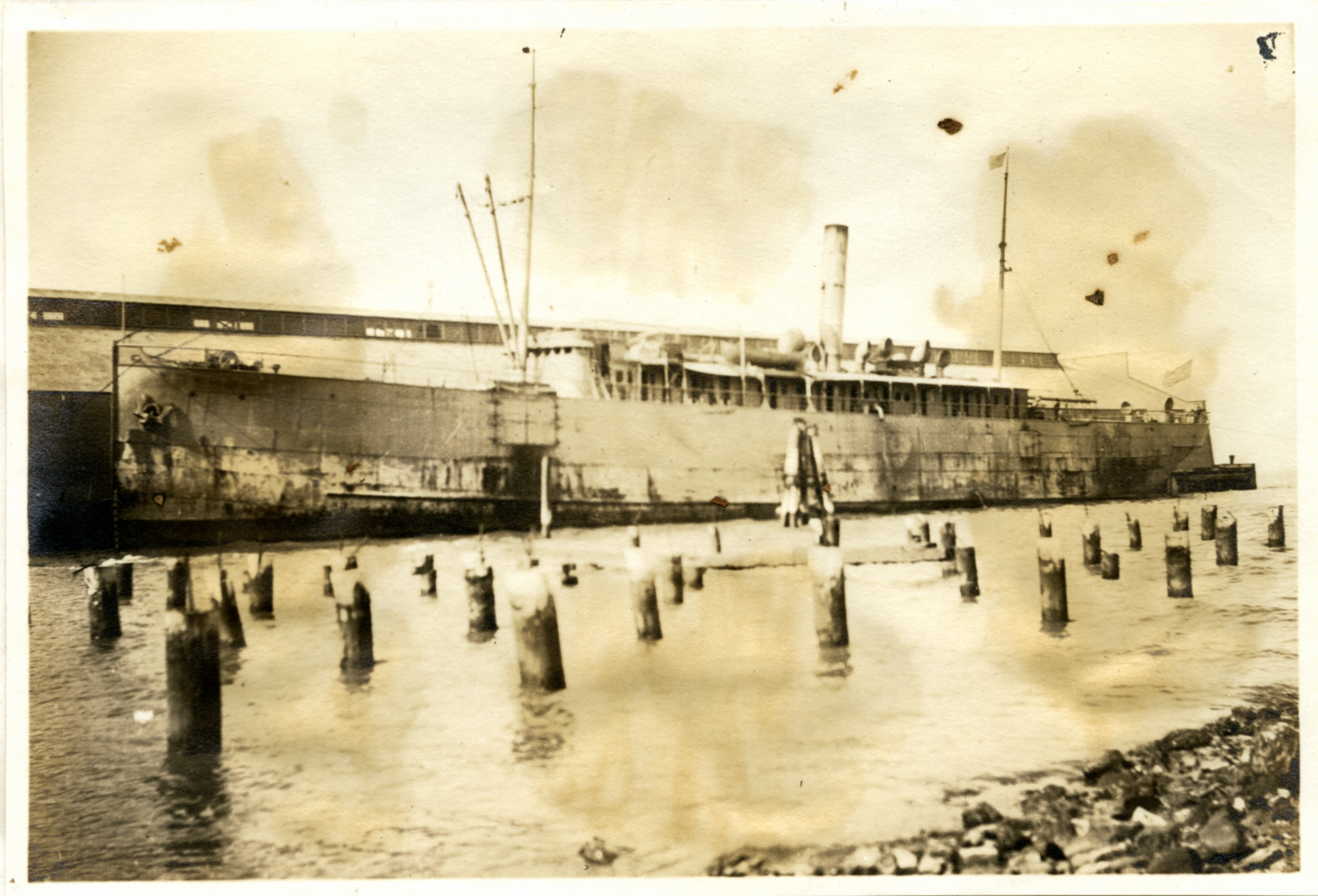
- SS Onondaga berthed in Charleston in May 1918.

History

United States
- Name: Onondaga
- Namesake: Onondaga
- Owner: Clyde Steamship Co.
- Builder: William Cramp & Sons, Philadelphia
- Yard number: 331
- Launched: 29 April 1905
- Sponsored by: Miss Emily Cramp Taylor
- Commissioned: 10 June 1905
- Maiden voyage: 16 June 1905
- Home port: New York
- Identification: US Official Number 201970; Call sign KTVC
- Fate: Wrecked, 28 June 1918

General characteristics
- Type: Cargo ship
- Tonnage: 2,696 GRT; 2,155 NRT
- Length: 275 ft 9 in (84.05 m)
- Beam: 40 ft 1 in (12.22 m)
- Depth: 19 ft 5 in (5.92 m)
- Installed power: 131 Nhp
- Propulsion: William Cramp & Sons 3-cylinder triple expansion
- Speed: 12.0 knots (13.8 mph; 22.2 km/h)

Onondaga was a steam cargo ship built in 1905 by William Cramp & Sons of Philadelphia for Clyde Steamship Company with intention of operating on their East Coast and West Indies routes.

== Design and construction ==
In 1904 Clyde Steamship & Co. following an increase in their freight business placed an order for two steamers of approximately 2,700 GRT to serve on their East coast route between Boston and southern ports. Onondaga was the second of theses ships, and was laid down at the William Cramp & Sons' Kensington Yard in Philadelphia (yard number 331) and launched on 29 April 1905, with Miss Emily Cramp Taylor, daughter of Charles T. Taylor, secretary of Cramp Shipbuilding Company being the sponsor. The ship was of the three-deck type, and had all the modern machinery fitted for quick loading and unloading of the cargo, including a large number of derricks similar to her sister-ship Chippewa.

Following an inspection on May 31 and the successful completion of sea trials, the steamer was transferred to her owners and departed for New York on June 10.

As built, the ship was 275 feet 9 inches (84.05 m) long (between perpendiculars) and 40 feet 1 inch (12.22 m) abeam, a depth of 19 feet 5 inches (5.92 m). Onondaga was assessed at 2,696 GRT and 2,155 NRT and had deadweight of approximately 4,000. The vessel had a steel hull, and a single 131 nhp triple-expansion steam engine, with cylinders of 18-inch (46 cm), 30-inch (76 cm) and 49-inch (120 cm) diameter with a 30-inch (76 cm) stroke, that drove a single screw propeller, and moved the ship at up to 12.0 knots (13.8 mph; 22.2 km/h).

== Operational history ==
Upon delivery Onondaga sailed from Philadelphia for New York on June 10, 1905. After loading, she departed on her maiden voyage on June 16, arriving at Charleston on June 19. The vessel then continued down to Jacksonville for loading, and left it on June 22 for her return trip. After stopping at Brunswick and Charleston to take on more cargo, she arrived at Boston on June 27, thus ending her maiden voyage.

Onondaga continued serving the same route for the rest of her career, connecting Charleston, Brunswick and Jacksonville with Boston, with occasional stops at Georgetown. The steamer carried a variety of general cargo from the southern ports, mostly lumber, cotton, naval stores, vegetables and fruit.

On October 27, 1906 she experienced problems with her propeller operation and had to be docked to fix the problem with her tail-shaft. After finishing the repairs the vessel departed for her normal trip on October 30.

=== 1907 Grounding ===
Onondaga left Boston on her usual trip at around 16:00 on January 12, bound for Charleston and continuing to Jacksonville. She was under command of captain Grant Bunnell and had a crew of 27 men and carried approximately 1,800 tons of cargo, consisting mostly of general merchandise, such as large quantity of boots and shoes, bales of hay, paper, about 30 carloads of potatoes and three racing automobiles destined for a car race in Florida. The ship passed the Highland Light in clear weather and continued south at a speed of about 10 kn (12 mph; 19 km/h). Right about when the Nauset Light was expected to be seen the weather became thick, according to the captain, and no lights could be observed. The ship continued sailing on her course and the Chatham Light was expected to be seen, but due to poor visibility no lights were seen again, nor could they hear a whistling buoy off the Old Harbor bar. After consulting his log, captain Bunnell came to conclusion that he probably overtravelled on his current path, and ordered the vessel to turn in-shore for a short time to try to find the lights. He also ordered the crew to make sounding and it showed it was still deep enough to continue sailing.

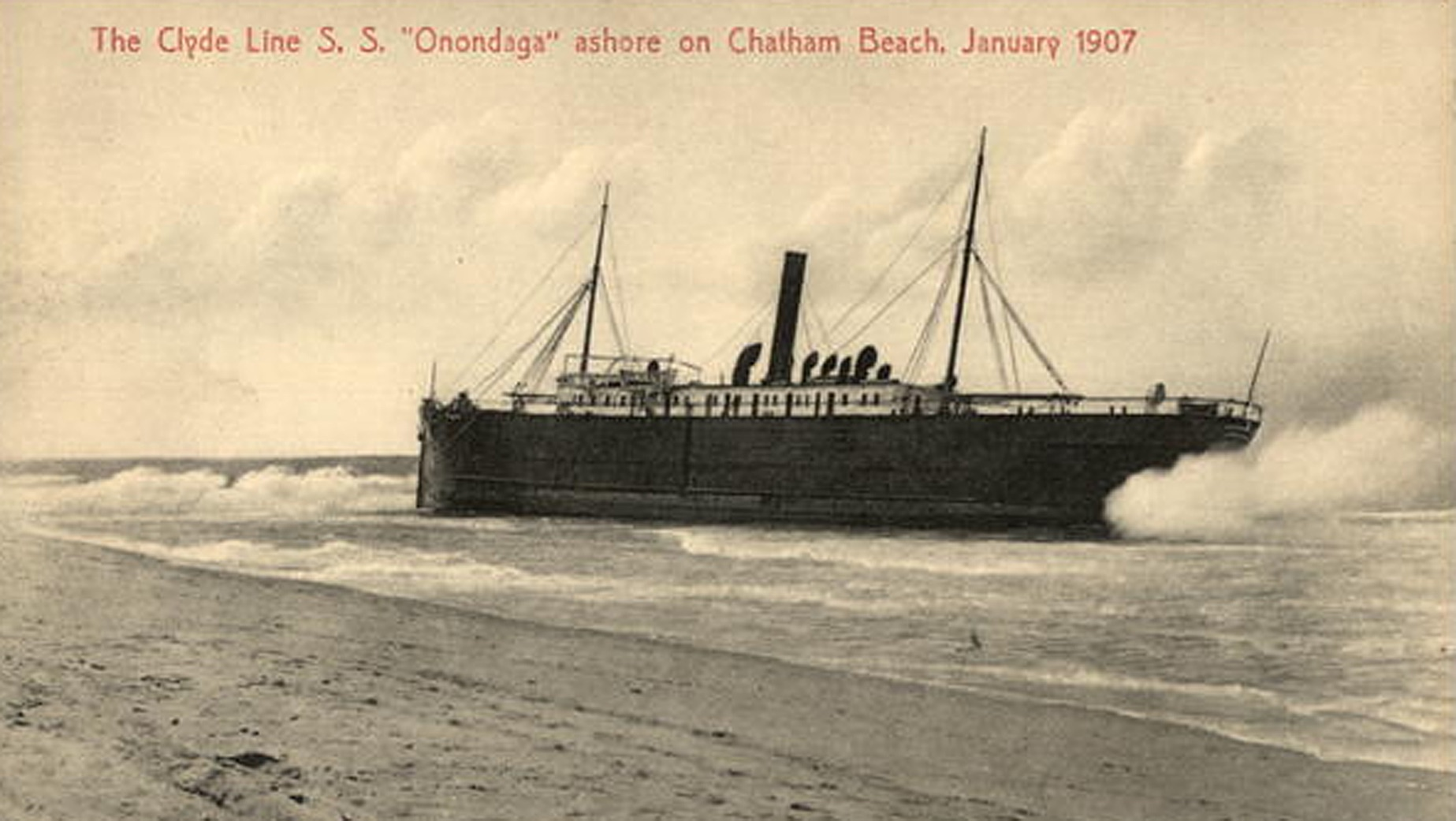
Onondaga beached on Orleans Beach, January 1907.

After a while, at about 01:30 on January 13, as still no lights were seen or sounds heard, another sounding was made and the depth of only 7 fathoms was reported, and soon after breakers were spotted. The ship's engine was put in reverse but while it may have slowed her down, Onondaga' bow rode straight on the sunken rip, getting stuck in the sand with her momentum swinging the vessel broadside and driving her further north. As the ship was in no immediate danger, the crew remained on board until the daylight. The life savers from the nearby stations rushed to the steamer's aid, as she came ashore, but their help was not needed at the time. Two tugs, Mercury and Orion, came from Boston next day, but they did not attempt to refloat the ship right away. On January 14, the US revenue cutter Gresham arrived and attempted for about an hour to drag Onondaga off Orleans Beach but failed. Two more tugs were sent, and over the next week several more attempts were made to dislodge the steamer but none of them came to fruition. Soon it became clear that the ship had to be lightened and some cargo was unloaded on the beach and later carted to Orleans to be taken to Boston. Many more attempts were made but whenever significant progress was made, the weather would turn stormy and would drive Onondaga further up the beach undoing any gains that were accomplished during the day. By the end of February, all of the steamer's cargo was discharged, some taken to Boston, and some sold at auction locally or simply given away. After two months of tries, Onondaga was finally floated on March 14 and proceeded to Boston towed by tug Underwriter and reached port in the evening of the same day. She was berthed to unload her remaining cargo of granite and machinery and put into drydock afterwards for examination which revealed that many bottom plates were damaged and had to be replaced in addition to her engines being full of sand. Onondaga was towed by Underwriter to William Cramp's yard in Philadelphia on March 22 where she stayed until late April undergoing repairs.

=== Return to commercial service ===
After finishing the repairs, Onondaga sailed to Charleston at the end of April and returned to Boston on May 8, 1907 with a large cargo of lumber, naval stores, rosin and fruit. On March 5, 1908 the steamer towed her sister-ship Chippewa back to Jacksonville after the ship lost her propeller and tail-shaft soon after leaving the port. She continued sailing on the route until May 1908, when she was put into drydock at New York for repairs, but following Chippewa's grounding off Montauk Point in June 1908, she had to take over and return to her old route. On May 25, 1909 while on passage from Jacksonville to Boston, she encountered a dismasted and abandoned wreck of schooner Alaska about five miles southwest of Vineyard Sound lightship and took her in tow bringing the sailing ship to Vineyard Haven. She again came to the rescue in August of the same year when she towed another Clyde steamer Arapahoe from Charleston to New York when the latter vessel had her tail-shaft broken.

On February 27, 1910 a fire started inside a Clyde Steamship shed containing various goods, chiefly cotton, on Lewis wharf in Boston. Onondaga was berthed by the southern side of the wharf and her woodwork on the starboard side caught fire soon after the blaze spread along the wharf. The crew reacted in time by cutting the lines, and the towboats came to her aid pushing her away from the blaze. The vessel suffered approximately $10,000 worth of damage during the incident and was sent to New York for repairs.

Following the fire the steamer was chartered for two trips by the New York & Porto Rico Steamship Co. and brought 17,380 bags of sugar from Puerto-Rico to New Orleans on March 30, 1910 on her first voyage and a similar amount on her second trip to New York and Boston before resuming her regular service. She again was chartered to carry sugar from Puerto-Rico to New Orleans in April 1911.

After leaving Charleston on August 27, 1911 bound south for Jacksonville Onondaga ran into a gale about three hours after the departure. The storm got progressively stronger with increasing wind and rougher seas as the ship sailed further south until the storm turned into a hurricane. The waves were sweeping over the ship's deck causing damage to her crew quarters such as blown out windows and broken doors, but overall the vessel held up. A few miles north of Savannah the steamer's steering gear gave in and snapped forcing the crew to drop anchors which fortunately could hold the vessel. It took approximately nine hours for the crew to patch up the rudder and the ship was able to slowly move out of the hurricane by the morning of August 29. Onondaga safely reached Boston in the evening of September 1.

On February 9, 1912 while on her way out from Jacksonville Onondaga ran aground in the St. John's River but was soon refloated with the aid of tugs and suffered no apparent damage. In May 1912 the steamer was chartered to transport a large cargo of steel rails from Baltimore to Key West for the Florida East Coast Railroad being constructed at the time. The steamer then was put on the New York-Brunswick route where she remained for about a year. In October 1912 Onondaga made one trip to Wilmington to clear up backlog of cargo destined for that port.

On May 7, 1913 Onondaga ran aground in the St. John's River, about 15 miles east of Jacksonville while on passage from the port to New York with a large general cargo but was soon floated with the help of several tugs and suffered no injuries. She ran ashore again on December 17, 1913 in the river after leaving port of Jacksonville and was floated on December 22 with the aid of several tugs after having to discharge about 500 tons of cargo and proceeded to Boston two days later.

Onondaga had yet another encounter with a hurricane in September 1914 when she was again severely battered by the weather on her way from Jacksonville to Boston, when it took her 28 hours to cover 125 miles between the Frying Pan lightship and Diamond Shoal, off North Carolina coast.

On August 11, 1915 small schooner Franconia of 136 GRT while on her voyage from Windsor to New York with a cargo of lumber ran into dense fog about 18:00 off Chatham. While she started to take in sail, Onondaga was spotted slowly moving through the fog, and apparently unaware of the schooner's presence. Soon after the steamer struck her on the starboard side making a 20-foot wide hole and nearly sinking the sailing vessel. No injuries were suffered by anybody on board the schooner and Onondaga stood by and then took the damaged vessel in tow bringing her to Boston.

In September 1916 Onondaga temporarily took over another Clyde vessel's, Cherokee, route from New York to Wilmington and Brunswick while she was undergoing maintenance and repairs in dry dock in New York. The ship soon returned to her usual duties, but in January 1917 it was announced that Onondaga was being withdrawn from Boston service with new steamers taking over, however, two months later the vessel was back on her usual route. In August 1917 the steamer again ran aground while leaving port of Jacksonville and she had to be lightened before the tugs could successfully float her. In October 1917 following United States entry into World War I, Onondaga together with many other vessels over 2,500 tons capacity was requisitioned by the US Government. Onondaga would continue sailing on her usual route for the remainder of her career while under the government control.

=== Sinking ===
Onondaga left Boston in the afternoon of June 27, 1918 carrying a large cargo, consisting of large amounts of shoes, boots, leather, paper and mill products destined for Jacksonville via New York. She was under command of captain W. H. Googins and had a crew of 35 men. The ship ran into thick fog off Chatham in early morning of June 28 and captain Googins decided to anchor the ship and wait until the weather clears. The steamer remained idle from approximately 05:00 until noon on June 28 when it started clearing up and ship resumed her journey. By about 20:45 most of the crew retired to their quarters when suddenly a lookout spotted the breakers and gave a warning. Men poured out to the deck as the ship hit the rocks of Catomb Reef, about half a mile off Watch Hill Light injuring her bottom. The crew immediately took to the lifeboats as Onondaga started quickly to take on water. One lifeboat carrying the captain was smashed to pieces, injuring him in the process, but he was pulled out of the water by the crew. Everyone on board safely made to the shore where they were met by the local life-savers, while Onondaga quickly sank in approximately 30 feet of water bow first and listing to starboard. By the time the crew left Watch Hill next day, the steamer rolled over and only the tips of her masts could be observed sticking above the water.

The work on refloating the steamer started right away after examination by the divers, and continued on for several days. It was first decided to lighten up the ship and unload as much cargo as possible, with the first lighter arriving in New London on July 6. Three attempts were made to refloat the vessel, however, they all proved unsuccessful as the shifting tides moved the vessel considerably weakening her hull, and the salvage work was stopped on July 10. The ship was completely abandoned at the end of July and the wreck later was dynamited to clear the passage as it presented a danger to navigation.
