= SS Glitra =

Coordinates: 59°01′N 4°50′E

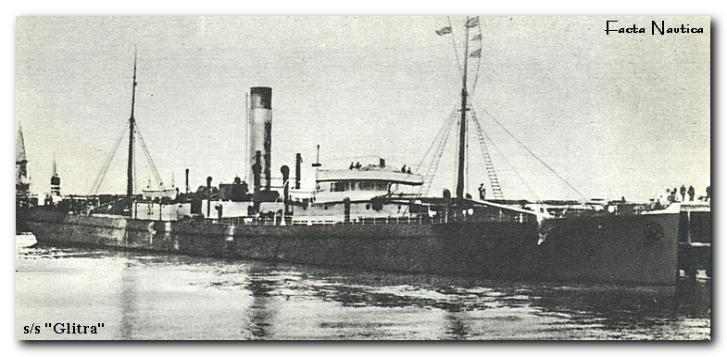

History

United Kingdom
- Name: 1881: Saxon Prince; 1896: Glitra
- Owner: 1881: James Knott; 1895: Johan T Salvesen
- Operator: 1881: James Knott; 1895: Christian Salvesen
- Port of registry: 1881: North Shields; 1895: Leith
- Builder: CS Swan & Hunter, Wallsend
- Yard number: 51
- Launched: 3 March 1881
- Completed: April 1881
- Identification: UK official number 137431; Code letters VLQW
- Fate: Captured and scuttled, 20 October 1914

General characteristics
- Tonnage: 866 GRT, 527 NRT
- Length: 215 ft (66 m)
- Beam: 30.7 ft (9.4 m)
- Depth: 13.8 ft (4.2 m)
- Installed power: 99 NHP
- Propulsion: Compound steam engine
- Speed: 9 knots (17 km/h)

SS Glitra was a steam cargo ship that was launched in 1881 as Saxon Prince. In 1896 she was renamed Glitra. In 1914 she became the first British merchant vessel to be sunk by a U-boat in the First World War.

== Building and ownership ==
Saxon Prince was the first steamship to be built for James Knott, a successful owner of collier brigs. She was also the first ship to which Knott gave a name ending in "Prince", which became a characteristic of his future Prince Line.

CS Swan & Hunter built Saxon Prince at Wallsend, launching her on 3 March 1881 and completing her that April. She had an iron hull and a two-cylinder compound steam engine. Her UK official number was 79247, her code letters were VLQW and Knott registered her in North Shields.

In 1895 Knott restructured his business as Prince Line (1895) Ltd and sold Saxon Prince to Christian Salvesen. In 1896 Salvesen renamed her Glitra and registered her in Leith.

== Capture and sinking ==
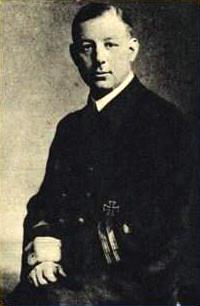
Kapitänleutnant Johannes Feldkirchner

On 20 October 1914 Glitra was en route from Grangemouth to Stavanger in Norway laden with coal, iron plate and oil when U-17, commanded by Kapitänleutnant Johannes Feldkirchner, stopped and searched her 14 nautical miles (26 km) west-southwest of Skudeneshavn, Rogaland, Norway, in accordance with prize law. Her crew was ordered into the lifeboat(s), and once all were safely off the ship a German boarding party scuttled Glitra by opening her seacocks.

One source states that U-17 towed the lifeboat(s) toward the Norwegian coast. Another states that the Royal Norwegian Navy 1. class torpedo boat HNoMS Hai, which was on neutrality protection duty, observed the incident but did not intervene as it was in international waters, and that after U-17 left, Hai towed the lifeboat(s) to the port of Skudeneshavn.

== Bibliography ==
- Burrell, David (1992). Furness Withy 1891–1991. Kendal: World Ship Society. ISBN 0-905617-70-3.
- Hegland, Jon Rustung; Lilleheim, Johan Henrik (1998). Norske torpedobåter gjennom 125 år (in Norwegian). Hundvåg: Sjømilitære Samfund ved Norsk Tidsskrift for Sjøvesen. ISBN 82-994738-1-0.
