= German submarine U-27 =

U-27 may refer to one of the following German submarines:

- SM U-27 (Germany), was the lead ship of the Type U 27 class of submarines; launched in 1913 and served in the First World War until sunk on 19 August 1915; the events surrounding U-27's sinking are known as the Baralong Incident
  - During the First World War, Germany also had these submarines with similar names:
    - SM UB-27, a Type UB II submarine launched in 1915 and sunk on 27 July 1917
    - SM UC-27, a Type UC II submarine launched in 1916 and surrendered on 3 February 1919
- German submarine U-27 (1936), a Type VIIA submarine that served in the Second World War until sunk on 20 September 1939
- German submarine U-27 (S176), a Type 206 submarine of the Bundesmarine that was launched in 1974 and scrapped in 1996
