= U27 =

U27 may refer to:

== Naval vessels ==
- Brazilian training ship Brasil (U-27)
- German submarine U-27, various vessels
- HMS Hastings (U27), a sloop of the Royal Navy
- U-27-class submarine (Austria-Hungary) of the Austro-Hungarian Navy
  - SM U-27 (Austria-Hungary), the lead boat of the class

== Other uses ==
- Cessna U-27 Caravan, an American utility aircraft
- Rhombicosidodecahedron
- Small nucleolar RNA SNORD27
