= Baralong incidents =

Naval engagements of WWI

- Part of the Atlantic U-boat campaign of World War I
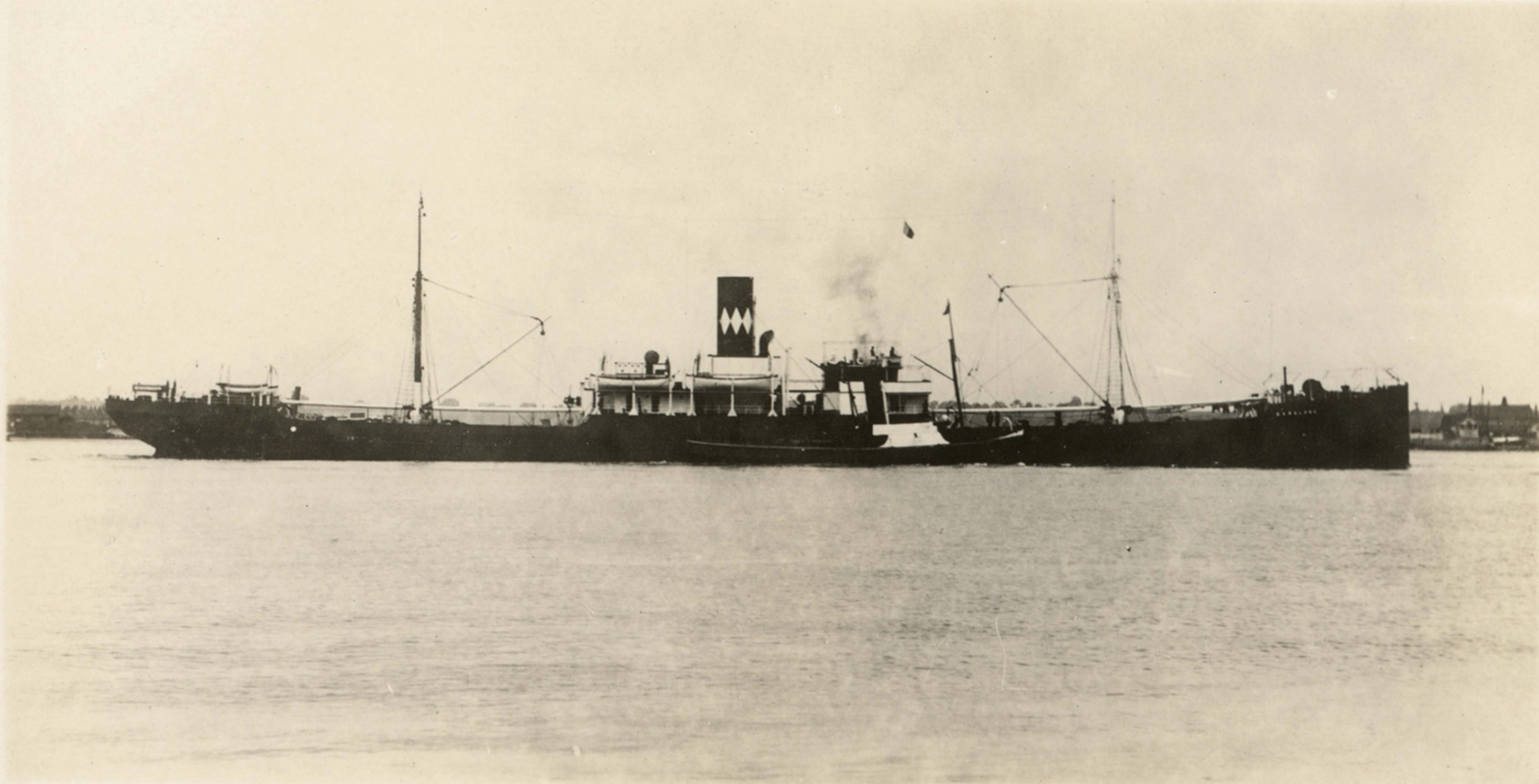
- HMS Baralong
Date	19 August and 24 September 1915
Location	Irish Sea, Atlantic Ocean

Belligerents
United Kingdom	Germany

Commanders and leaders
Godfrey Herbert; A. Wilmot-Smith	Bernd Wegener †; Klaus Hansen †

Strength
1 decoy vessel; 2 steamers	2 submarines

Casualties and losses
2 steamers damaged	2 submarines sunk

The Baralong incidents were two incidents during the First World War in August and September 1915, involving the Royal Navy Q-ship HMS Baralong and two German U-boats. Baralong sank U-27, which had been attacking a nearby merchant ship, the Nicosian. About a dozen of the crewmen managed to escape from the sinking submarine and Lieutenant Godfrey Herbert, commanding officer of Baralong, ordered the survivors to be fired on. All the survivors of U-27's sinking, including several who had reached the Nicosian, were shot by Baralong's crew and attached marines.

Later, Baralong under command of Andrew Wilmot-Smith sank U-41 in an incident which has also been described as a British war crime.

== First incident ==
=== Action of 19 August 1915 ===
After the sinking of RMS Lusitania by a German submarine in May 1915, Lieutenant-Commander Godfrey Herbert, commanding officer of Baralong, was visited by two officers of the Admiralty's Secret Service branch at the naval base at Queenstown, Ireland. He was told, "This Lusitania business is shocking. Unofficially, we are telling you... take no prisoners from U-boats."

Interviews with his subordinate officers have established Herbert's manner of commanding his ship.

Throughout the summer of 1915, Baralong continued routine patrol duties in the Irish Sea without encountering the enemy.

On 19 August 1915, U-24 sank the White Star Liner SS Arabic with the loss of 44 lives – this included three Americans and resulted in a diplomatic incident between Germany and the United States. Baralong's crew was infuriated by the attack.

Meanwhile, about 70 nautical miles (130 km; 81 mi) south of Queenstown, U-27, commanded by Kapitänleutnant Bernd Wegener, stopped the British steamer Nicosian with a warning shot in accordance with cruiser rules. The ship was carrying 354 American mules earmarked for the British Army in France. The Germans allowed the freighter's crew and passengers to board lifeboats, and prepared to sink the freighter with the U-boat's deck gun. However, Nicosian had sent out SOS messages about her plight. Gibson and Prendergast claim that these messages were still being sent from the ship when Baralong arrived, implying that at least some crew were still on board while U-27 commenced shelling. Halpern equivocates on the issue: they may or may not all have abandoned ship by that time. The messages also told Baralong, inaccurately, that a second submarine was present.

U-27 was lying off Nicosian's port quarter and firing into it when Baralong appeared on the scene, flying the ensign of the United States as a false flag. When she was half a mile away, Baralong ran up a signal flag indicating that she was going to rescue Nicosian's crew. Wegener acknowledged the signal, then ordered his men to cease firing, and took U-27 along the port side of Nicosian to intercept Baralong. As the submarine disappeared behind the steamship, Herbert steered Baralong on a parallel course along Nicosian's starboard side.

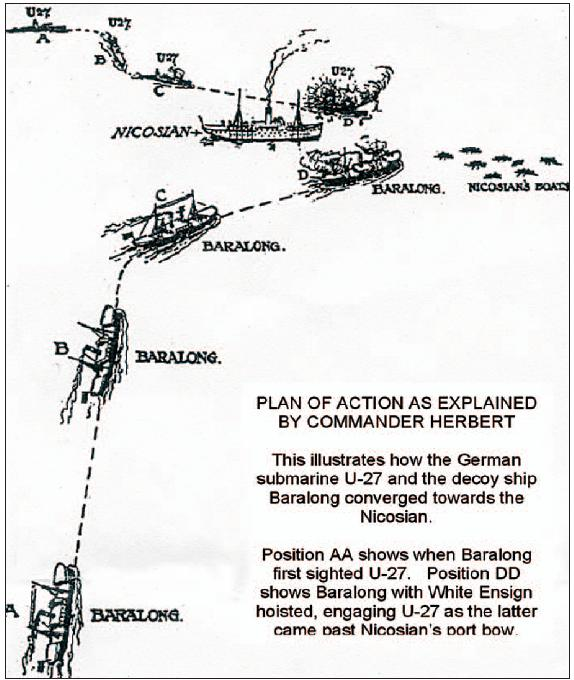
The action of 19 August 1915.

Before U-27 came round Nicosian's bow, Baralong hauled down the American flag, hoisted the Royal Navy's White Ensign, and unmasked her guns. As U-27 came into view from behind Nicosian, Baralong began shooting with its three 12-pounder guns at a range of 600 yd (550 m), firing 34 rounds. U-27 rolled over and began to sink.

According to Tony Bridgland;

Herbert screamed, "Cease fire!" But his men's blood was up. They were avenging the Arabic and the Lusitania. For them this was no time to cease firing, even as the survivors of the crew appeared on the outer casing, struggling out of their clothes to swim away from her. There was a mighty hiss of compressed air from her tanks and the U-27 vanished from sight in a vortex of giant rumbling bubbles, leaving a pall of smoke over the spot where she had been. It had taken only a few minutes to fire the thirty-four shells into her.

Meanwhile, Nicosian's crew were cheering from the lifeboats.

Twelve men survived the sinking of the submarine: the crews of her two deck guns and those who had been on the conning tower. They swam to Nicosian and attempted to climb up its hanging lifeboat falls and pilot ladder. Herbert claimed in his report to the Admiralty to have been worried that the German survivors might try to scuttle the steamer as an explanation for why he ordered his men to open fire with small arms. Between four and six managed to get on board. Wegener is described by some accounts as being shot while trying to swim to the Baralong, in other accounts he boarded the ship.

Herbert was told by the Nicosian's master that the crew of the vessel kept weapons aboard in the chart room. He then sent Baralong's 12 Royal Marines, commanded by a Corporal Collins, to find the surviving German sailors aboard Nicosian. The Germans were discovered in the engine room and shot on sight. According to Sub-Lieutenant Gordon Charles Steele: "Wegener ran to a cabin on the upper deck – I later found out it was Manning's bathroom. The marines broke down the door with the butts of their rifles, but Wegener squeezed through a scuttle and dropped into the sea. He still had his life-jacket on and put up his arms in surrender. Corporal Collins, however, took aim and shot him through the head." Corporal Collins later recalled that, after Wegener's death, Herbert threw a revolver in the dead German captain's face and screamed, "What about the Lusitania, you bastard!" An alternative allegation by the Admiralty is that the Germans who boarded Nicosian were killed by the freighter's engine room staff; this report apparently came from the officer commanding the muleteers.

=== Aftermath ===
In Herbert's report to the Admiralty, he stated he feared the survivors from the U-boat's crew would board the freighter and scuttle it, so he ordered the Royal Marines on his ship to shoot the survivors. If they had scuttled the freighter, it could have been considered as negligence on the part of Herbert. Moments before Baralong began its attack, the submarine was firing on the freighter. It is not known if the escaping sailors actually intended to scuttle the freighter.

The Admiralty, upon receiving Herbert's report, immediately ordered its suppression, but the strict censorship imposed on the event failed when Americans who had witnessed the incident from Nicosian's lifeboats spoke to newspaper reporters after their return to the United States.

=== German memorandum ===
The German government delivered a memorandum on the incident via the American ambassador in Berlin, who received it on 6 December 1915. In it, they cited six US citizens as witnesses, stating they had made sworn depositions regarding the incident before notaries public in the USA.

The statements said that five survivors from U-27 managed to board Nicosian, while the rest were shot and killed on Herbert's orders while clinging to the merchant vessel's lifeboat falls. It was further stated that when Herbert ordered his Marines to board Nicosian, he gave the order "take no prisoners". Four German sailors were found in Nicosian's engine room and propeller shaft tunnel, and were killed. According to the witness statements, U-27's commander was shot while swimming towards Baralong.

The memorandum demanded that the captain and crew of Baralong be tried for the murder of unarmed German sailors, threatening to "take the serious decision of retribution for an unpunished crime". Sir Edward Grey replied through the American ambassador that the incident could be grouped together with three "German crimes" that also took place within 48 hours: the Germans' sinking of SS Arabic, their attack on a stranded British submarine on the neutral Danish coast, and their attack on the crew of the steamship Ruel after they had abandoned ship, and suggested that they be placed before a tribunal composed of US Navy officers. This was rejected by German authorities.

=== German reaction ===
A debate took place in the Reichstag on 15 January 1916, where the incident was described as a "cowardly murder" and Grey's note as being "full of insolence and arrogance". It was announced that reprisals had been decided, but not what they would be.

Meanwhile, the Military Bureau for the Investigation of Violations of the Laws of War (German: Militäruntersuchungstelle für Verletzungen des Kriegsrechts) added Baralong's commanding officer, whose name was known only as "Captain William McBride", to the Prussian Ministry of War's "Black List of Englishmen who are Guilty of Violations of the Laws of War vis-à-vis Members of the German Armed Forces".

A German medal was issued commemorating the event.

As a precaution to protect the ships against any reprisals against their crews, in October 1915 HMS Baralong was renamed HMS Wyandra and transferred to the Mediterranean. Baralong's name was deleted from Lloyd's Register. In 1916 Wyandra returned to the Ellerman & Bucknall Line under the name Manica. Nicosian was renamed Nevisian, and the crew was issued new Discharge Books, with the voyage omitted.

Baralong's crew were later awarded £185 prize bounty for sinking U-27.

== Second incident ==
=== Action of 24 September 1915 ===
On 24 September 1915, Baralong sank the U-boat U-41, for which its commanding officer at the time, Lieutenant-Commander Andrew Wilmot-Smith was awarded the DSO, the engineer J. M. Dowie the DSC, and two of the crew received a DSM. A bounty of £1,000 was also awarded. Wilmot-Smith was later awarded £170 prize bounty by the Prize Court.

U-41 was in the process of sinking SS Urbino with gunfire when Baralong, which had set out from Falmouth the day before, arrived on the scene, flying an American flag. Baralong followed U-41's instructions while at the same time manoevring to 700 yards and an angle where her guns could fire. Baralong opened fire with starboard and rear guns, marines aiding with rifle fire. The conning tower was struck killing the captain and six crew, and other shots struck the hull. U-41 began to list then dived. It abruptly resurfaced and only two crew escaped (a wounded Leutnant and the helmsman) from a hatch before it sank again. The two crew and the crew of the Urbino were picked up by Baralong before it returned to Falmouth the following morning.

When U-41 surfaced near Baralong, the latter allegedly opened fire while continuing to fly the American flag, and sank the U-boat.

=== Aftermath of the second incident ===
Unlike the neutral Americans in the first incident, the only witnesses to the second attack were the German and British sailors present. Oberleutnant zur See Iwan Crompton, after returning to Germany from a prisoner-of-war camp, reported that Baralong had run down the lifeboat he was in; he leapt clear and was soon afterward taken aboard Baralong. The British crew denied that they had run down the lifeboat. Crompton later published an account of U-41's exploits in 1917, U-41: der zweite Baralong-Fall, which termed the sinking of U-41 a "second Baralong case".

The event was also commemorated by a propaganda medal designed by the German engraver Karl Goetz. This was one of many medals that were popular in Germany from about 1910 to 1940.

== See also ==
- Commerce raiding – Form of naval warfare
- HMS E13 – Submarine of the Royal Navy
- Merchant raiders – Warship type disguised as a non-combatant
- Q-ship – Heavily armed merchant ships with concealed weaponry
- Tonnage war – Military strategy aimed at merchant shipping
