= HMS Manica =

1901 merchant ship

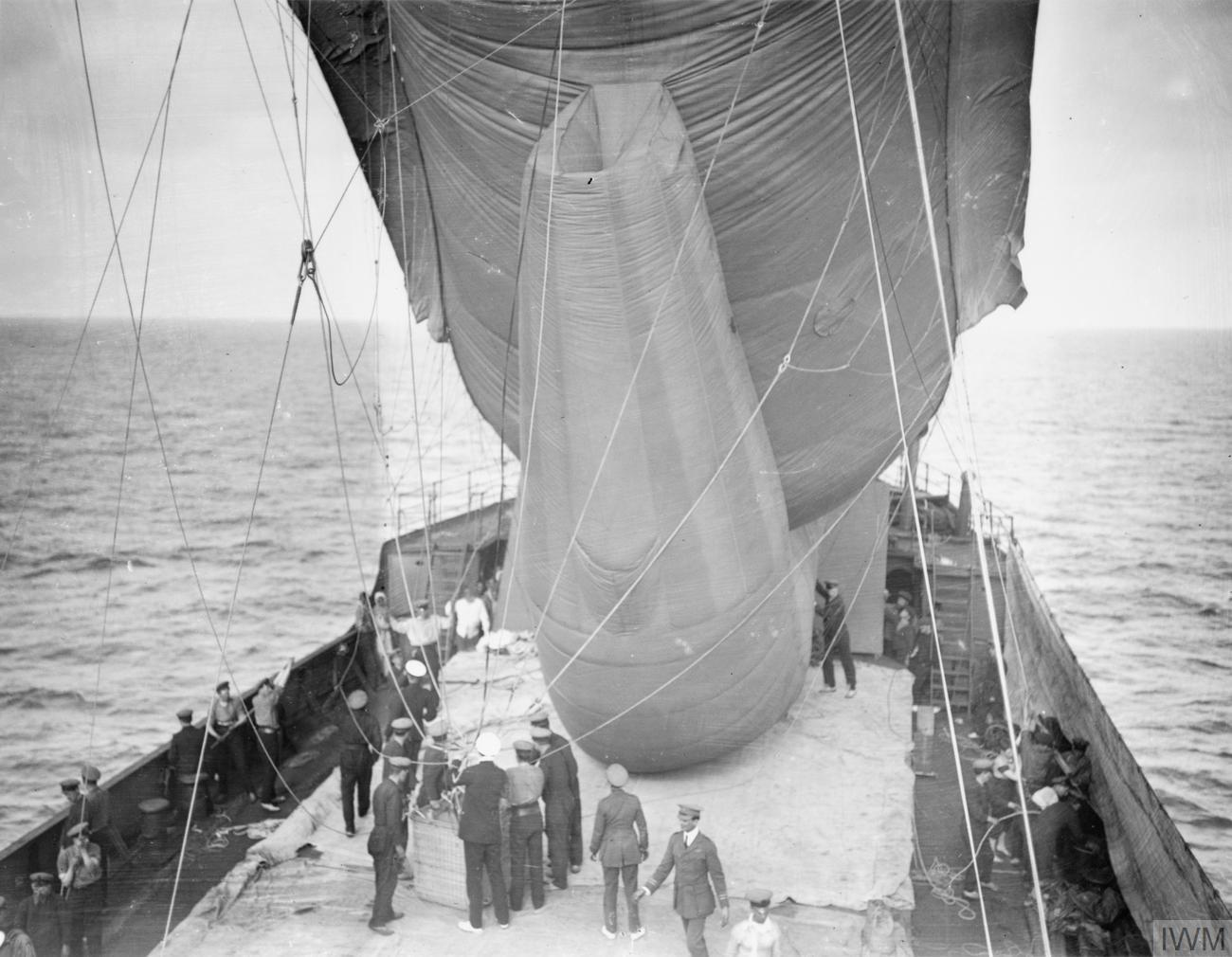
- Manica prepares to launch her kite balloon off Gallipoli, 1915

History
- Name: 1900: Manica; 1915: HMS Manica; 1918: Huntball; 1920: Phorus
- Namesake: 1901: Manica; 1920: Phorus
- Owner: 1900: Bucknall Steamship Lines Ltd; 1914: Ellerman & Bucknall SS Co Ltd; 1918: Admiralty; 1920: Anglo-Saxon Petroleum
- Operator: 1901: Bucknall Brothers; 1915: Royal Navy
- Port of registry: 1901: (United Kingdom) London; 1915: (United Kingdom); 1919: (United Kingdom) London
- Builder: Sir James Laing & Sons Ltd, Sunderland
- Yard number: 580
- Launched: 25 September 1900
- Completed: December 1900
- Commissioned: into Royal Navy, March 1915
- Decommissioned: out of Royal Navy, October 1919
- Identification: UK official number 112782; 1901: code letters SDGP; 1915: pennant number Y4.17; 1917: pennant number Y3.313; by 1930: code letters TVRP
- Fate: Scrapped 1931

General characteristics
- Type: 1900: cargo ship; 1915: kite balloon ship; 1917: oil tanker
- Tonnage: 1914: 4,120 GRT, 2,621 NRT; 1930: 4,247 GRT, 2,753 NRT
- Length: 360.5 ft (109.9 m)
- Beam: 47.0 ft (14.3 m)
- Depth: 28.3 ft (8.6 m)
- Decks: 2
- Installed power: 530 NHP
- Propulsion: triple expansion engine
- Speed: 12 knots (22 km/h)
- Armament: by 1916: 1 × 4-inch gun
- Aircraft carried: 1915: kite balloon; 1916: kite balloon, plus seaplane
- Notes: sister ships: Barotse, Bantu, Baralong

HMS Manica was a merchant steamship that was built in England in 1901 and was scrapped in Japan in 1931. She was built as a dry cargo ship but spent the latter part of her career as an oil tanker.

She is most notable for her service in the First World War. In 1915 she was converted into the Royal Navy's first kite balloon ship. Later in the war the Navy had her converted into an oiler. The Admiralty sold her back into civilian service in 1920.

She was renamed Huntball in 1917 and Phorus in 1920. Her original owner was Bucknall Steamship Lines Ltd, which in 1914 became part of Ellerman Lines and was renamed Ellerman & Bucknall. After the First World War she was owned by Anglo-Saxon Petroleum, which is part of Royal Dutch Shell.

== Building ==
In 1900 and 1901 Bucknall Steamship Lines Ltd took delivery of a set of four new sister ships from two shipbuilders in North East England. In 1900 Sir James Laing & Sons Ltd at Sunderland on the River Wear launched Manica on 25 September and Barotse on 22 December. In 1901 Armstrong, Whitworth & Co Ltd at Low Walker on the River Tyne launched Bantu on 16 July and Baralong on 12 September. All four ships were named after peoples or places in southern Africa, where Bucknall traded.

The four ships were built to almost identical dimensions. Manica's registered length was 360.5 ft (109.9 m), her beam was 47.0 ft (14.3 m) and her depth was 28.3 ft (8.6 m). Her tonnages were 4,120 GRT and 2,621 NRT. T Richardson & Sons of Hartlepool built her engine, which was a three-cylinder triple expansion steam engine rated at 530 NHP.

Sir James Laing completed Manica on 21 December 1900. Bucknall's registered her in London. Her UK official number was 112782 and her code letters were SDGP.

== Crew ==
In Bucknall's service, Manica was crewed by a mixture of white and Lascar seafarers. In October 1907 one of her Lascars was hospitalised in Suez and died of pneumonia. In May 1908 three of her Lascars died of beri-beri and were buried at sea. Later that month another she lost another Lascar at sea, believed drowned. In July 1908 she arrived in the River Tyne, where another four Lascars were taken ashore to hospital with beri-beri.

At the end of August 1910 Manica docked in Port Adelaide, South Australia. Two members of her crew jumped ship there. One was from Ceylon and the other was African American, which made them "prohibited immigrants" under the White Australia policy. The South Australian authorities held her Master, Francis Potts, responsible. On 22 September he was convicted at Port Adelaide Police Court, fined £100 for each man and charged 20 shillings for court costs.

Details of the two fugitives were published in South Australian newspapers, and £10 reward was offered for their capture. On 24 September they were arrested on a farm some miles from Adelaide. On 26 September Port Adelaide Police Court convicted them of desertion and sentenced them to seven days in prison.

Manica lost two more Lascars listed as missing at sea: one in February 1914 and the other in January 1915. Each was believed to have drowned.

== Kite balloon ship ==
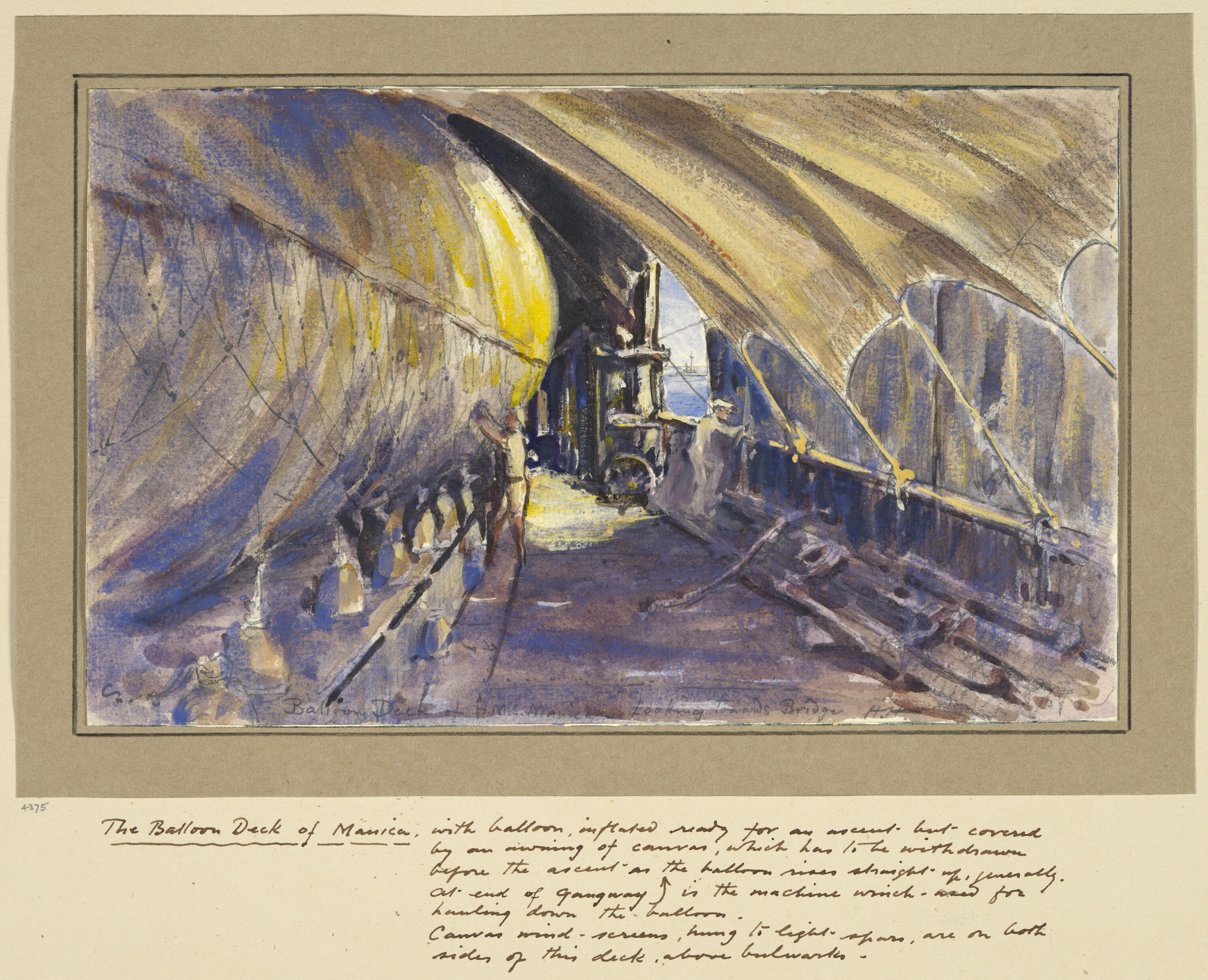
The Balloon Deck of Manica, July 4th 1915 – watercolour by Herbert Hillier of Manica's balloon being inflated during the Gallipoli campaign

On 12 February 1915 Manica arrived in the Port of London with a cargo of manure. On 11 March the Admiralty requisitioned her. She was converted to carry a kite balloon for naval observation. She was fitted with long sloping deck from her forecastle to her waist, a hydrogen compressor to inflate her balloon, a dynamo to drive the compressor, and a winch to raise and lower the balloon. In civilian service she had lacked wireless telegraph, so a deckhouse for a W/T installation was added. She would need a larger complement as a kite balloon ship than as a cargo ship, so accommodation for more officers and men was added.

On 22 March she was commissioned as HMS Manica, with the pennant number Y4.17. She was manned by Royal Naval Reserve officers and merchant marine reserve crew. On 25 March Manica's chief steward died of natural causes. He is buried at Flaybrick Hill Cemetery in Birkenhead.

=== Gallipoli ===
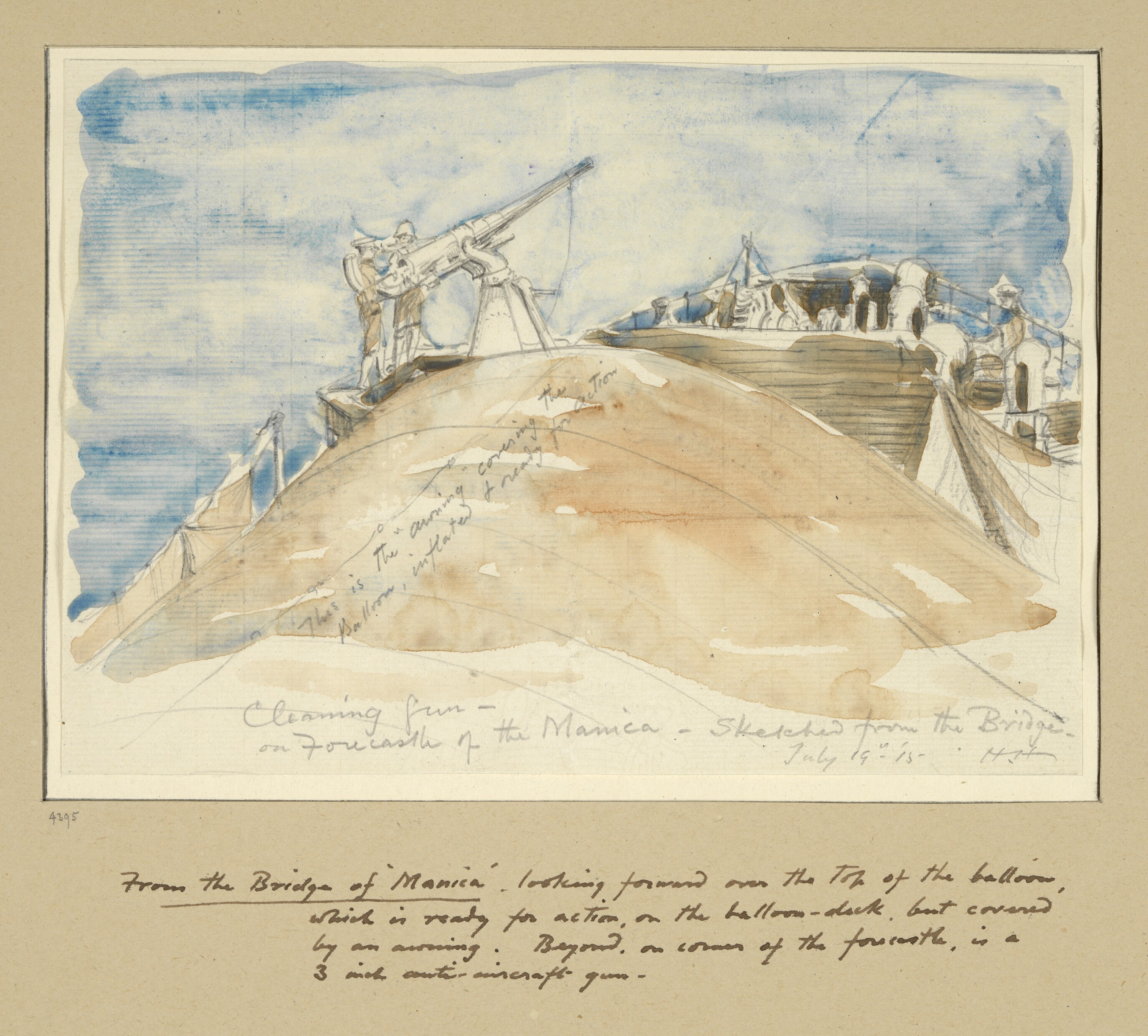
From the Bridge of Manica, July 19th 1915 – watercolour by Herbert Hillier of Manica's forward deck, showing one of her guns

On 16 April Manica reached Lemnos in the Aegean Sea, which was an Allied base for the Gallipoli campaign. She spent the next few days making test flights of her balloon. She was assigned to the Second Squadron to support the Landing at Anzac Cove. On various dates Manica directed the fire of Royal Navy battleships including HMS Queen Elizabeth, Triumph and Lord Nelson.

Manica's balloon observers first directed Royal Navy gunnery on 19 April, when they directed the bombardment of an Ottoman Army encampment. On 24 April this was followed by shelling the Ottoman barracks at Kabatepe. On 27 April an observer in Manica's balloon sighted an Ottoman transport ship on the far side of the Gallipoli peninsula, and successfully directed Queen Elizabeth's 15-inch guns to hit and sink her.

Thereafter, Manica's balloon directed naval bombardments of two field batteries on 28 April, the town of Çanakkale on 30 April and 25 June, a battery of what were described as "8-inch (200 mm) guns" on 2 May, four Ottoman batteries on 8 May and a house believed to be an Ottoman military headquarters on 12 May.

On at least two occasions Ottoman aircraft including a Etrich Taube tried to bomb either Manica or her balloon. Neither attack succeeded. Manica's defensive armament included anti-aircraft guns, which proved effective.

In August 1915 Manica supported the Landing at Suvla Bay. On 12 August UB-8 fired a torpedo at her, but it passed under the ship and missed. On 14 August a U-boat fired two torpedoes at Manica, but this attack also failed.

=== East Africa ===
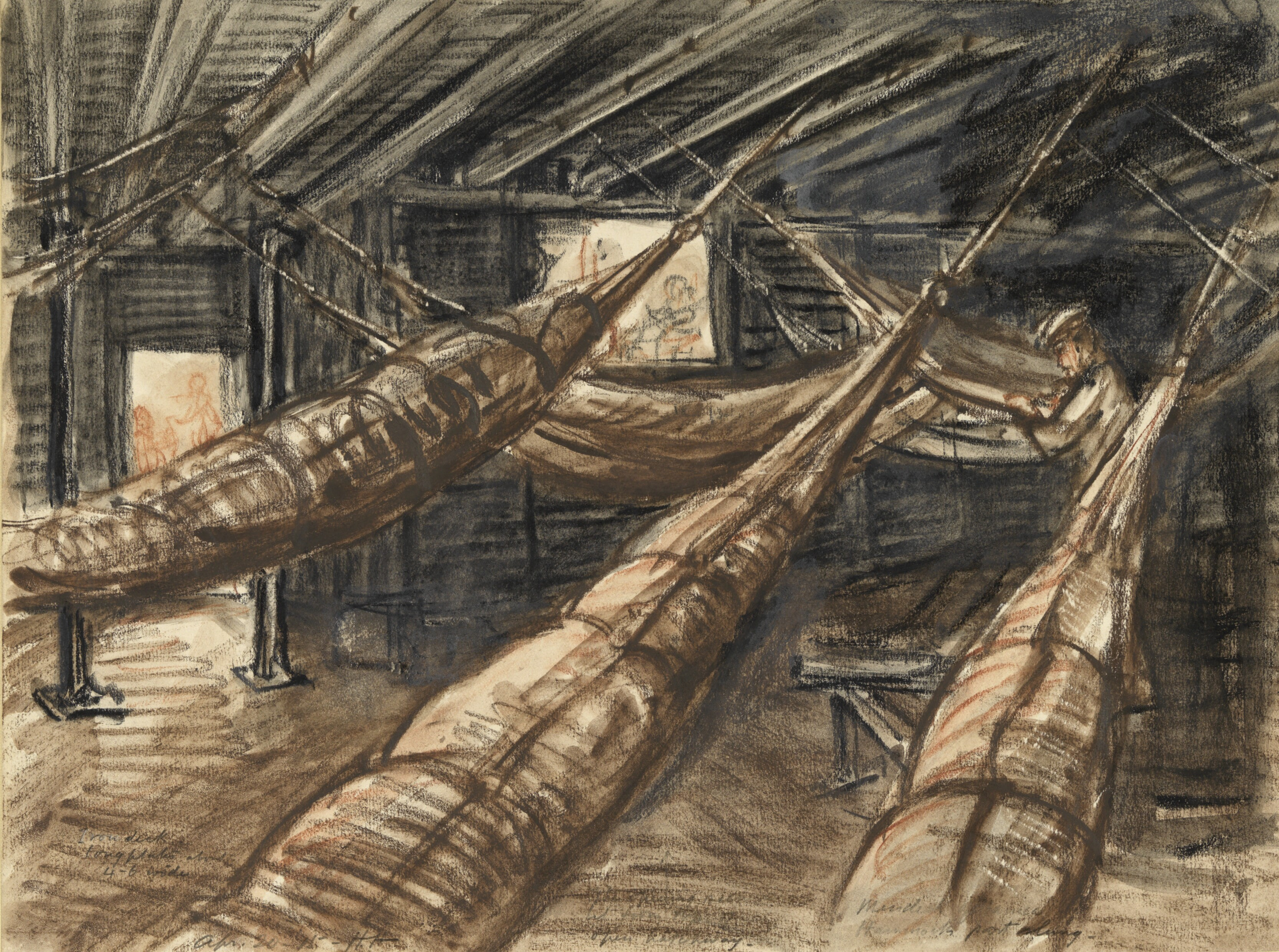
Mess-deck of Manica, with Hammocks Part Slung, April 11th 1915 – watercolour by Herbert Hillier

By November 1915 Manica had been withdrawn from the Gallipoli campaign and was being refitted. On 19 February 1916 she left Cammell Laird's number four dry dock in Birkenhead. On 9 March she left Birkenhead for German East Africa to support the Allied East African campaign, now carrying a seaplane as well as her balloon.

Manica bunkered at Gibraltar and Port Said, passed through the Suez Canal and called at Mombasa in British East Africa before reaching Zanzibar on 15 April. From 22 April 1916 Manica operated from Zanzibar along the coast of German East Africa, where observations by her balloon and seaplane directed Royal Navy bombardments of German positions ashore.

On 13 June the battleship HMS Vengeance and protected cruisers Challenger and Pioneer bombarded the town of Tanga near the border with British East Africa, as Manica's seaplane directed their guns. On 7 July the protected cruiser HMS Talbot and monitor Severn, again supported by Manica's observers, entered Manza Bay and put troops ashore who occupied Tanga.

On 13 July Manica deployed her seaplane and balloon to direct the guns of HMS Severn, which bombarded the town of Pangani. The Germans surrendered the town to British land and naval forces on 23 July. Manica did the same for bombardments of the town of Sadani by the monitor Mersey on 26 July and battleship Vengeance on 3 August. The Navy reached each town at the same time as British and Empire land forces that were advancing south from British East Africa. Each town quickly surrendered.

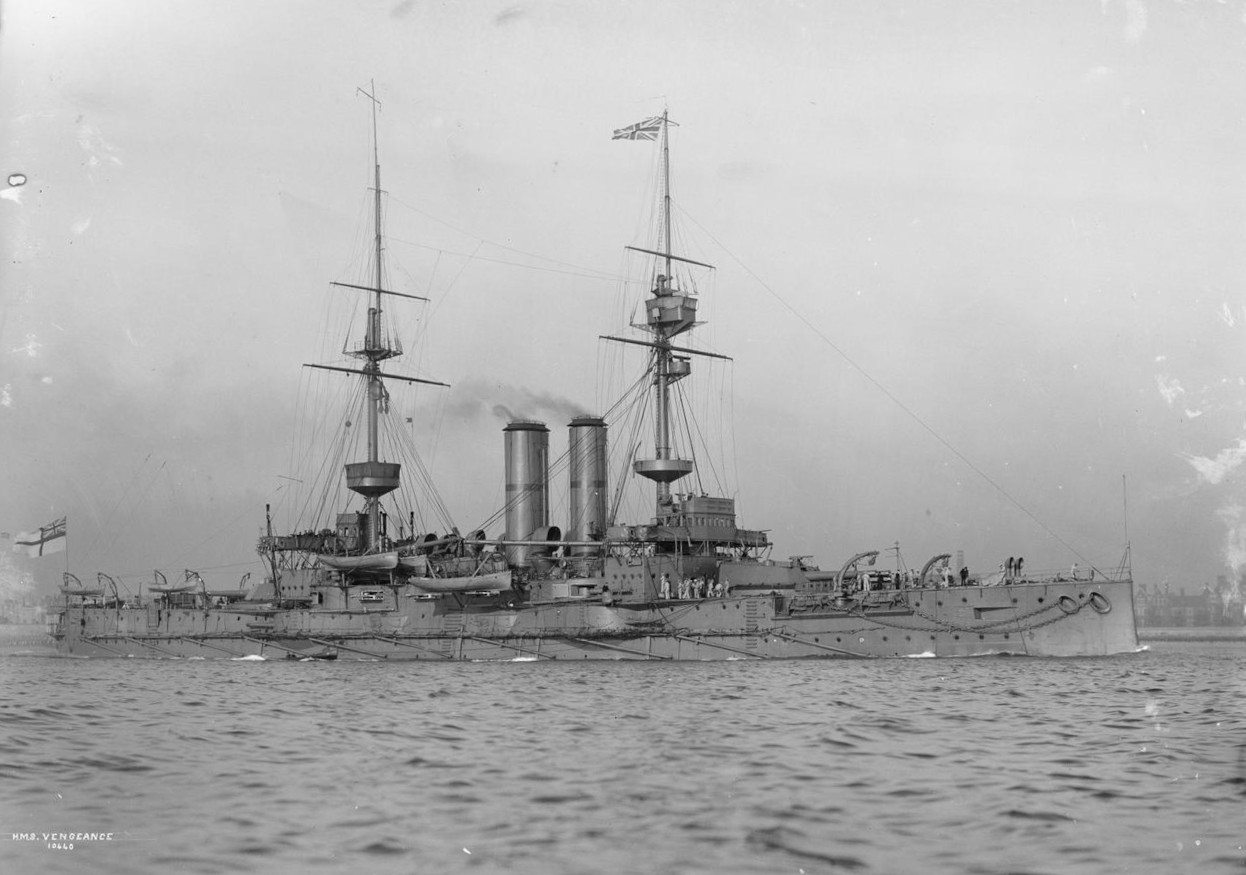
HMS Vengeance, flagship of the East African campaign

In August British forces attacked the coastal town of Bagamoyo. Manica's seaplane and balloon provided artillery observations for bombardments of the town by HMS Talbot on 1 August and Vengeance on 4 August. Between 0330 and 0400 hrs on 15 August a flotilla that included Vengeance, Challenger, Severn, Mersey, the armed merchant cruiser Himalaya, Manica and the armed tug Helmuth anchored off Bagamoyo. An hour later troops including Royal Marines and Zanzibar Rifles went ashore. During the morning Manica's seaplane suffered an engine fault and had to return to the ship. But her balloon provided aerial observations to direct naval artillery against German positions ashore, whose defences included one of the 105 mm naval guns that the German forces had salvaged from the cruiser SMS Königsberg. On the morning 16 August, German artillery defending Bagamoyo fired at Manica, but no damage was recorded. On 18 August she deployed her seaplane to observe for Severn to bombard the shore.

On 21 July Manica had deployed her seaplane and balloon to direct Mersey's guns in a bombardment of Dar es Salaam, the capital of German East Africa. The Navy resumed the attack on 21 August, when Manica's balloon and seaplane observed for Vengeance to bombard the city. On 3 September, British and Empire land forces reached the northern outskirts of the city, the Navy briefly bombarded German positions on the same front, and the German authorities surrendered.

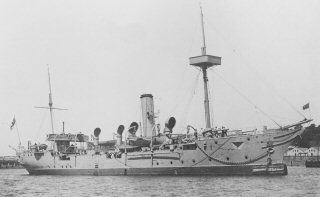
The Condor-class sloop HMS Rinaldo

After Dar es Salaam fell, British and Empire forces took the remaining coast of German East Africa with little or no resistance. The last German coastal resistance was in the swampy Rufiji delta, where Manica and the Condor-class sloop Rinaldo bombarded a German encampment on 8 September.

Manica remained in East Africa until March 1917. She left two crewmen buried in the war cemetery in Dar es Salaam. One was a fireman who was drowned on 6 August 1916 when he was returning to the ship in her liberty boat when he fell between the boat and the ship. The other was an RNAS air mechanic who died on 21 March 1917. On 25 March Manica left Zanzibar. In May 1917 two of her complement died of heat stroke and one died of typhoid fever. All three were buried at sea.

== Oil tanker ==
In August 1917 the Admiralty had Manica converted into an oil tanker at Bombay. For her new rôle she was renamed Huntball. On 15 April 1918 the Admiralty bought Huntball from Ellerman and Bucknall.

In 1919 Anglo-Saxon Petroleum bought Huntball. In 1920, in accordance with standard practice, Anglo-Saxon renamed the ship after a genus of mollusc. Phorus is a synonym of the gastropod genus Xenophora. She was given the new civilian code letters TVRP. Throughout the 1920s she traded in the Far East, and also to Australia and occasionally New Zealand.

In February 1931 Phorus arrived in Nagasaki in Japan. On 3 July that year she arrived in Osaka to be scrapped.

== Bibliography ==
- Cato, Conrad (1919). The Navy Everywhere. Constable: London.
- Collard, Ian (2014). Ellerman Lines Remembering a Great British Company. Stroud: The History Press. ISBN 978-0-7524-8963-6.
