= HMS Helmuth =

History

United Kingdom
- Name: Helmuth
- Acquired: 1914
- Commissioned: 1914

General characteristics
- Type: Armed tug
- Propulsion: steam engine
- Armament: 1 × 3-pounder gun

HMS Helmuth was a German tug that the Royal Navy captured at the beginning of World War I and armed as a picket boat. She served in the East African campaign including the battles of Zanzibar and Tanga, she survived a German attack at Dar es Salaam, and took part in blockading SMS Königsberg in the Rujifi Delta. In 1916 she took part in an amphibious assault on the coastal town of Bagamoyo.

== Career ==
At the beginning of World War I, the German-registered Helmuth was in Zanzibar Harbour. Several prominent Germans in Zanzibar planned to sail on her to German East Africa to escape internment, but her engines were in disrepair and the British seized her before the Germans could use her. The Royal Navy had her repaired and armed with a 3-pounder gun. Helmuth became a picket boat at the mouth of Zanzibar Harbour, commanded by Sub-lieutenant Clement Charlewood, RNR.

When Königsberg appeared at the harbour mouth on 20 September 1914, Helmuth was unable to warn the protected cruiser HMS Pegasus, which was in port repairing her engines. In the ensuing engagement, Königsberg sank Pegasus. On leaving the harbour, Königsberg fired several shots at Helmuth, driving her crew overboard and killing a native working in the engine room. But Helmuth was only lightly damaged, and the British recovered her.

On 2 November 1914, before the Battle of Tanga, Helmuth swept the harbour for mines before the British landing, but found none.

On 28 November 1914, Helmuth accompanied the battleship HMS Goliath and protected cruiser Fox to Dar es Salaam. Lieutenant Walter Orde, RN commanded Helmuth, with Charlewood second in command. The Royal Navy was inspecting suspected German passenger ships when German troops fired on the inspecting officers, and on Goliath's steam pinnace, Fox's steam cutter and Helmuth. Heavy fire wounded Orde and damaged Helmuth, causing a dangerous escape of steam. The stoker of Fox's cutter was mortally wounded, but the cutter's commander, Lieutenant Eric Corson, RN, took over from him. All the three boats safely negotiated the narrow channel. For their actions Corson, Orde and Charlewood were all awarded the Distinguished Service Cross, and the coxswains of the pinnace and cutter were awarded the Conspicuous Gallantry Medal.

Early on the morning of 22 July 1916 the kite balloon ship HMS Manica suffered a small fire in Zanzibar harbour. Helmuth came alongside, with a fire pump, but her help was not required.

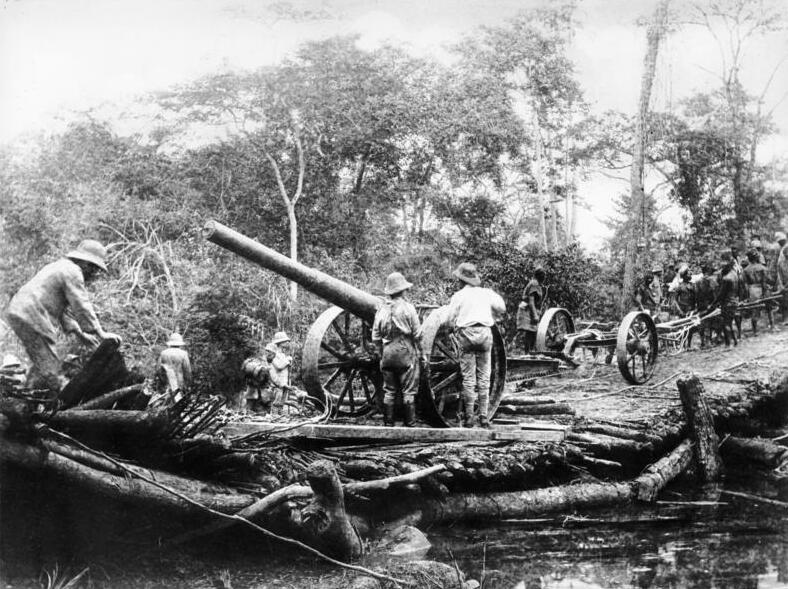
One of SMS Königsberg's 105 mm naval guns, converted to use on land

On 15 August 1916 Helmuth was part of the Royal Naval flotilla that successfully attacked Bagamoyo. The town's defences included one of the 105 mm naval guns that the Germans had salvaged from Königsberg. The gun was emplaced on a hill just south of the town, and was firing at the monitors HMS Severn and Mersey, which were anchored some distance out to sea.

However, the German gun could not be depressed low enough to cover targets nearer the shore, so Helmuth and two other vessels, each armed with one 3-pounder gun, steamed close to the shore. At a range of about 500 metres the three vessels opened fire on the German position, helping to force its crew to abandon their gun and retreat. A section of armed sailors with a machine gun were then able to storm the hill, capturing the gun and more than 80 rounds of 105 mm ammunition.

== Sources ==
- Burg, David F; Purcell, L Edward (2004). Almanac of World War I. Lexington, KY: University Press of Kentucky. p. 34. ISBN 0-8131-2072-1. "tanga helmuth."
- Cato, Conrad (1919). "XII H.M.S. "Manica" in East Africa". The Navy Everywhere. Constable: London.
- Unknown (1960). "Helmuth at Tanga". Tanzania Notes and Records (54). Tanzania Society – via Google Books.
