= HMS E3 =

Submarine of the Royal Navy

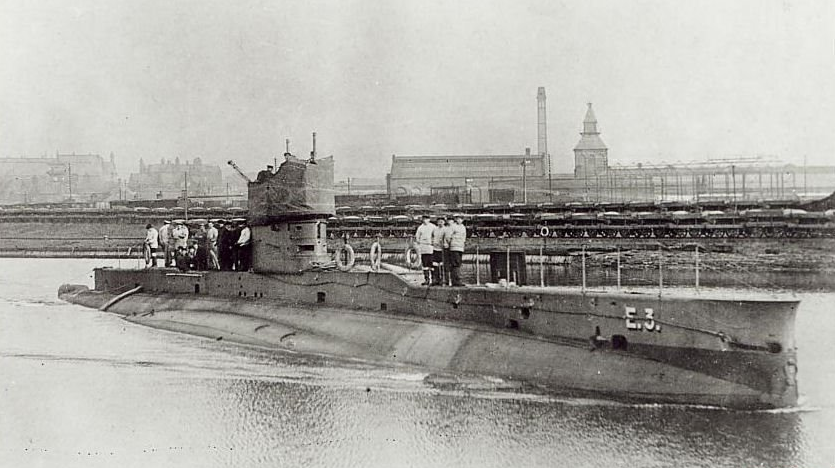
- British E-class submarine HMS E3

History

United Kingdom
- Name: E3
- Builder: Vickers, Barrow-in-Furness
- Laid down: 27 April 1911
- Launched: 29 October 1912
- Commissioned: 29 May 1914
- Fate: Sunk on 18 October 1914

General characteristics
- Class & type: E-class submarine
- Displacement: 665 long tons (676 t) (surfaced); 796 long tons (809 t) (submerged)
- Length: 178 ft (54 m)
- Beam: 15.05 ft (4.59 m)
- Draught: 12 ft 6 in (3.81 m)
- Installed power: 800 hp (600 kW) (diesel engines); 420 hp (310 kW)
- Propulsion: 2 × Vickers diesel engines; 2 × electric motors; 2 × shafts
- Speed: 15.25 knots (28.24 km/h; 17.55 mph) (surfaced); 9.75 knots (18.06 km/h; 11.22 mph) (submerged)
- Range: 325 nmi (602 km; 374 mi) (surfaced)
- Endurance: 24 days
- Complement: 3 officers, 28 ratings
- Armament: 4 × 18-inch (450 mm) torpedo tubes (1 bow, 2 beam, 1 stern; 10 torpedoes)

HMS E3 was the third E-class submarine to be constructed, built at Barrow by Vickers in 1911–1912. Built with compartmentalisation and endurance not previously achievable, these were the best submarines in the Royal Navy at the start of the First World War. She was sunk in the first ever successful attack on one submarine by another, when she was torpedoed on 18 October 1914 by U-27 north of Schiermonnikoog, the Netherlands.

== Design ==
The early British E-class submarines, from E1 to E8, had a displacement of 652 long tons (662 t) at the surface and 795 long tons (808 t) while submerged. They had a length overall of 180 feet (55 m) and a beam of 22 feet 8.5 inches (6.922 m), and were powered by two 800-horsepower (600 kW) Vickers eight-cylinder two-stroke diesel engines and two 420 horsepower (310 kW) electric motors. The class had a maximum surface speed of 16 knots (30 km/h; 18 mph) and a submerged speed of 10 knots (19 km/h; 12 mph), with a fuel capacity of 50 long tons (51 t) of diesel affording a range of 3,225 miles (5,190 km; 2,802 nmi) when travelling at 10 knots, while submerged they had a range of 85 miles (137 km; 74 nmi) at 5 knots (9.3 km/h; 5.8 mph). Her complement was three officers and 28 ratings.

The early 'Group 1' E-class boats were armed with four 18-inch (450 mm) torpedo tubes, one in the bow, one either side amidships, and one in the stern; a total of eight torpedoes were carried. Group 1 boats were not fitted with a deck gun during construction, but those involved in the Dardanelles campaign had guns mounted forward of the sail while at Malta Dockyard.

E-class submarines had wireless systems with 1 kW power ratings; in some submarines, these were later upgraded to 3 kW systems by removing a midship torpedo tube. Their maximum design depth was 100 feet (30 m) although in service some reached depths of below 200 feet (61 m). Some submarines contained Fessenden oscillator systems.

== Service history ==
When war was declared with Germany on 5 August 1914, E3 was based at Harwich, in the 8th Submarine Flotilla of the Home Fleets.

=== Loss ===
E3 sailed from Harwich on 16 October to patrol off Borkum in the North Sea. On 18 October, she spotted some German destroyers ahead but was unable to get into a position to take a shot at them. Unable to pass them, Commander Cholmley retreated into the bay to wait for them to disperse. As he did so, he failed to see that the bay was also occupied by U-27, under Kapitänleutnant Bernd Wegener.

Wegener was surfaced and patrolling between the Ems and Borkum when at 11:25, an object resembling a buoy was spotted where no buoy should be. Suspecting a British submarine, U-27 immediately dived and closed the object. Although 'conned down', the number 83 was clearly visible on the conning tower of the British boat, now identified as such beyond reasonable doubt. Wegener tracked the submarine for two hours until able to approach 'up sun'. He noted that the look-outs were staring intently in the other direction, towards the Ems. When the distance had closed to 300 yd (270 m), a single torpedo was fired by U-27. Detonation followed shortly after, and E3 sank immediately. Survivors were visible in the water but fearing a second British submarine might have been lurking nearby, U-27 dived and withdrew. 30 minutes later, the U-boat returned to the scene to search for evidence and possible survivors but without success. All 31 members of E3's crew were lost.

== The wreck ==
In October 1990, the stern section was snagged by a fishing boat north of Schiermonnikoog, the Netherlands, which in turn alerted divers from Zeester. The wreck of E3 was discovered on 14 October 1994. The stern of E3 had been blown off in the explosion and was found to be completely detached. The stern section— including the stern torpedo chamber — was later raised. The stern hatch was open, but the nature of the explosion indicates that men in the engine room and motor compartments would have died instantly. The motor and engine rooms are fully exposed and have consequently been looted of all removable fittings, including the bell.

The sail has been removed by fishing nets and the broken periscope standards are still evident. The sail ladder is said to have been donated to the Submarine Museum but is not officially listed within their collections. E3's torpedo loading hatch is open and the bow section is largely intact.
