= German submarine U-27 (S176) =

German submarine

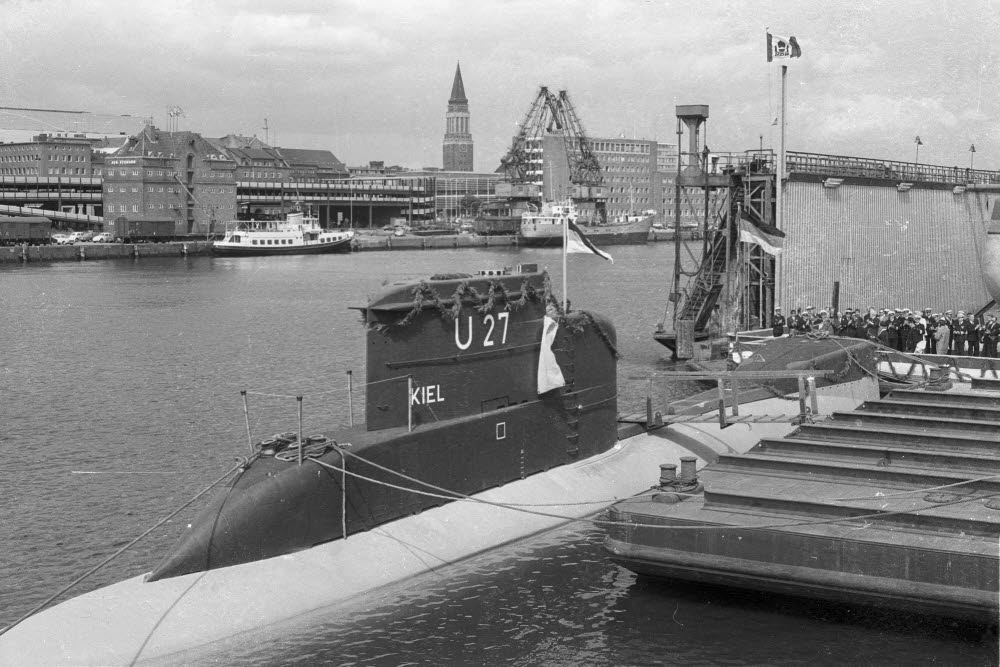
German submarine U 27 (S 176)

German submarine U-27 was a West German Type 206 submarine that was 21 August 1973 and scrapped the 13 June 1996.

On the 6 March 1988 the U-27 collided with the Osenberg-B oil platform. The collision occurred at a depth of about 30 meters and damage was done to a cross brace in the base of the platform. The damage was significant on both the platform and the submarine. The damage to the platform was repaired in the fall of 1988, and a cross bar was replaced, among other things. The damage to the platform amounted to between NOK 80 and 100 million. During a maritime declaration in Kiel on December 1, 1988, it appeared that the submarine had kept 8.8 knots and that only passive sonar had been used. The submarine had not caught any noise from the platform and had not registered it with the aids it was using. The submarine commander was criticized for not using all navigational aids and for not taking into account any inconsistencies in navigation. Due to military considerations, no details of sonar or other navigational aids were provided in the maritime explanation.
