= Small nucleolar RNA SNORD27 =

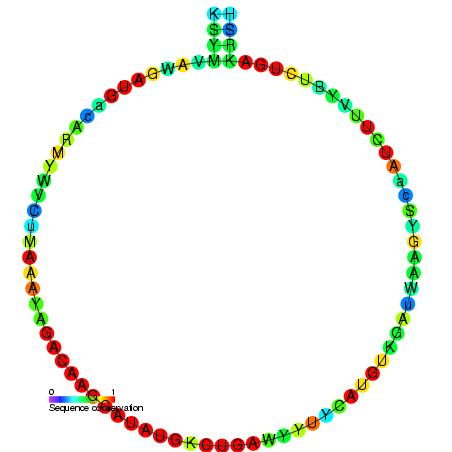
- Predicted secondary structure and sequence conservation of SNORD27

Identifiers
- Symbol: SNORD27
- Alt. Symbols: U27
- Rfam: RF00086

Other data
- RNA type: Gene; snRNA; snoRNA; CD-box
- Domain: Eukaryota
- GO: GO:0006396 GO:0005730
- SO: SO:0000593
- PDB structures: PDBe

In molecular biology, Small nucleolar RNA SNORD27 (also known as U27 in mammals and snR74 in fungi) is a member of the C/D class of snoRNA which contain the C (UGAUGA) and D (CUGA) box motifs. U27 is encoded within the U22 snoRNA host gene (UHG) in mammals and is thought to act as a 2'-O-ribose methylation guide for ribosomal RNA. This family also contains several related snoRNAs from yeast and plants.
