= SM U-27 (Germany) =

German U-Boat – sunk in Baralong incident

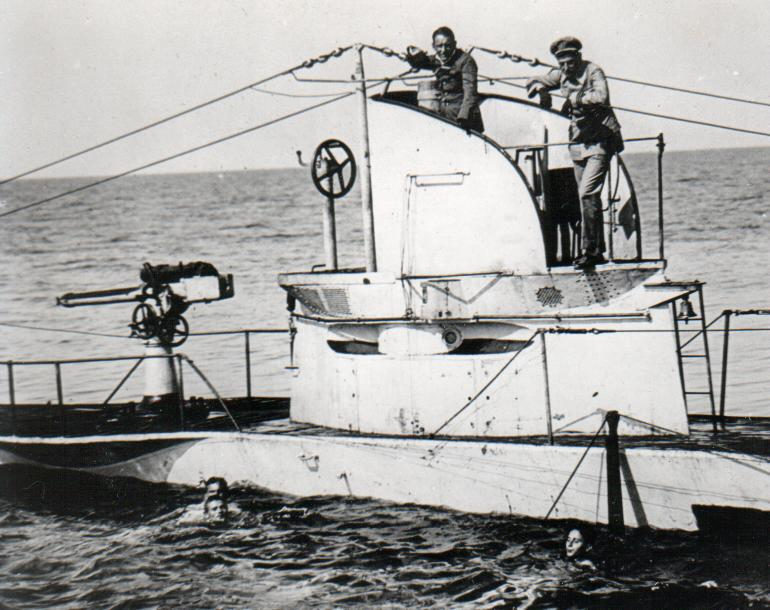

History

German Empire
- Name: U-27
- Ordered: 19 February 1912
- Builder: Kaiserliche Werft Danzig
- Yard number: 17
- Launched: 14 July 1913
- Commissioned: 8 May 1914
- Fate: Sunk 19 August 1915

General characteristics
- Class & type: Type U 27 submarine
- Displacement: 675 t (664 long tons) surfaced; 878 t (864 long tons) submerged
- Length: 64.70 m (212 ft 3 in) (o/a)
- Beam: 6.32 m (20 ft 9 in)
- Draught: 3.48 m (11 ft 5 in)
- Speed: 16.7 knots (30.9 km/h; 19.2 mph) surfaced; 9.8 knots (18.1 km/h; 11.3 mph) submerged
- Range: 8,420 nmi (15,590 km; 9,690 mi) at 8 knots (15 km/h; 9.2 mph) surfaced; 85 nmi (157 km; 98 mi) at 5 knots (9.3 km/h; 5.8 mph) submerged
- Test depth: 50 m (164 ft)
- Complement: 4 officers, 31 enlisted
- Armament: 4 × 50 cm (19.7 in) torpedo tubes; 1 × 8.8 cm (3.5 in) SK L/30 deck gun

Service record
- Part of: IV Flotilla; 1 August 1914 – 19 August 1915
- Commanders: Kptlt. Bernd Wegener; 8 May 1914 – 19 August 1915
- Operations: 3 patrols
- Victories: 9 merchant ships sunk (25,172 GRT); 2 warships sunk (6,325 tons); 1 auxiliary warship sunk (5,948 GRT)

SM U-27 was a German Type U-27 U-boat built for service in the Imperial German Navy. She was launched on 14 July 1913, and commissioned on 8 May 1914 with Kapitänleutnant Bernd Wegener in command.

On 18 October 1914, the British submarine HMS E3 was torpedoed and sunk in the North Sea by U-27. This was the first action in which one submarine sank another. On 19 August 1915 it was itself sunk by the Q-Ship HMS Baralong, in an incident involving the alleged massacre of the submarine's crew.

== Sinking of HMS E3 ==
HMS E3 had sailed from Harwich on 16 October to patrol off Borkum in the North Sea. On 18 October, E3 spotted some German destroyers ahead but was unable to get into a position to take a shot at them. Unable to pass them, Commander Cholmley retreated into the bay to wait for them to disperse. As he did so, he failed to see that the bay was also occupied by U-27, under Kapitänleutnant Bernd Wegener.

Wegener was surfaced and patrolling between the Ems and Borkum when at 11:25, an object resembling a buoy was spotted where no buoy should be. Suspecting a British submarine, U-27 immediately dived and closed the object. Although the enemy was ‘conned down’, the number 83 was clearly visible on the conning tower of the British boat, now identified as such beyond reasonable doubt. Wegener tracked the submarine for two hours until able to approach ‘up sun’. He noted that the look-outs were staring intently in the other direction, towards the Ems. When the distance had closed to 300 m (330 yd), U-27 fired two G6 torpedoes. An explosion 12 seconds later sank E3 immediately. The KTB records that men (probably the look-outs from the bridge) were visible in the water but U-27 dived and withdrew, fearful that a second British submarine might be lurking nearby. 30 minutes later, the U-boat returned to the scene to search for evidence and possible survivors but without success. All 28 members of E3's crew were lost.

== Other encounters ==
- 31 October 1914, U-27 sank the seaplane carrier HMS Hermes in the Straits of Dover, in position 51°06.3′N 001°50.3′E.
- 11 March 1915, U-27 sank the armed merchant cruiser HMS Bayano off Carswell Point, Stranraer at position 55°3′N 5°26′W.
- 18 May 1915 – Drumcree (United Kingdom) was torpedoed and sunk by U-27 eleven miles NE of Trevose Head in Cornwall. She was in ballast from Barry to Port Arthur, Texas.
- 19 May 1915 – Dumfries (United Kingdom) was torpedoed and sunk by U-27 13 miles north of Trevose Head. She was carrying coal from Cardiff to Livorno with the loss of two lives

== Sinking ==
On 19 August 1915, U-27 was sunk in the Western Approaches in position 50°43′N 07°22′W by gunfire from Q-ship HMS Baralong. The same day, U-boat U-24 had sunk the White Star Liner SS Arabic, infuriating the crew of Baralong which were in the region but could do nothing. Upon encountering U-27, the crew of Baralong hauled down the neutral American flag they had been flying as a false flag and hauled up the White Ensign. A one-sided engagement ensued in which U-27 was hit several times and began to sink.

According to Tony Bridgland;

Herbert screamed, "Cease fire!" But his men's blood was up. They were avenging the Arabic and the Lusitania. For them this was no time to cease firing, even as the survivors of the crew appeared on the outer casing, struggling out of their clothes to swim away from her. There was a mighty hiss of compressed air from her tanks and the U-27 vanished from sight in a vortex of giant rumbling bubbles, leaving a pall of smoke over the spot where she had been. It had taken only a few minutes to fire the thirty-four shells into her.

12 German survivors swam from the wreck U-27 to Baralong seeking safety, but commanding officer Godfrey Herbert, acting under unofficial advice relayed by two officers of the Admiralty's Secret Service branch to, "Take no prisoners from U-boats", ordered his men, in violation of the Hague Conventions, to shoot the unarmed German survivors in the water with small arms, killing all 12. Herbert then dispatched 12 Royal Marines from Baralong with orders to take no prisoners from the remaining German survivors aboard Nicosian. The incident sparked outrage in Germany, and a debate took place in the Reichstag on 15 January 1916, where it was described as a "cowardly murder"; the German government soon announced that they would conduct reprisals, although they did not specify what they would be. A British offer of a combined American inquiry into the incident and three concurrent German atrocities was rejected.

A German medal was issued commemorating the victims of the event.

Meanwhile, the Military Bureau for the Investigation of Violations of the Laws of War (German: Militäruntersuchungstelle für Verletzungen des Kriegsrechts) added Baralong's commanding officer, whose name was known only as "Captain William McBride", to the Prussian Ministry of War's "Black List of Englishmen who are Guilty of Violations of the Laws of War vis-à-vis Members of the German Armed Forces".

== Summary of raiding history ==
Date	Name	Nationality	Tonnage (Note: Merchant ship tonnages are in gross register tons. Military vessels are listed by tons displacement.)	Fate
18 October 1914	HMS E3	Royal Navy	725	Sunk
31 October 1914	HMS Hermes	Royal Navy	5,600	Sunk
11 March 1915	HMS Bayano	Royal Navy	5,948	Sunk
13 March 1915	Hartdale	United Kingdom	3,839	Sunk
18 May 1915	Drumcree	United Kingdom	4,052	Sunk
19 May 1915	Dumfries	United Kingdom	4,121	Sunk
21 May 1915	Glenholm	United Kingdom	1,968	Sunk
18 August 1915	Ben Vrackie	United Kingdom	3,908	Sunk
18 August 1915	Gladiator	United Kingdom	3,359	Sunk
18 August 1915	Magda	Norway	1,063	Sunk
18 August 1915	Sverresborg	Norway	1,144	Sunk
19 August 1915	Peña Castillo	Spain	1,718	Sunk

== Bibliography ==
- Gröner, Erich; Jung, Dieter; Maass, Martin (1991). German Warships 1815–1945, U-boats and Mine Warfare Vessels. Vol. 2. Translated by Thomas, Keith; Magowan, Rachel. London: Conway Maritime Press. ISBN 0-85177-593-4.
