= SS Arabic (1902) =

Sunken British ocean liner

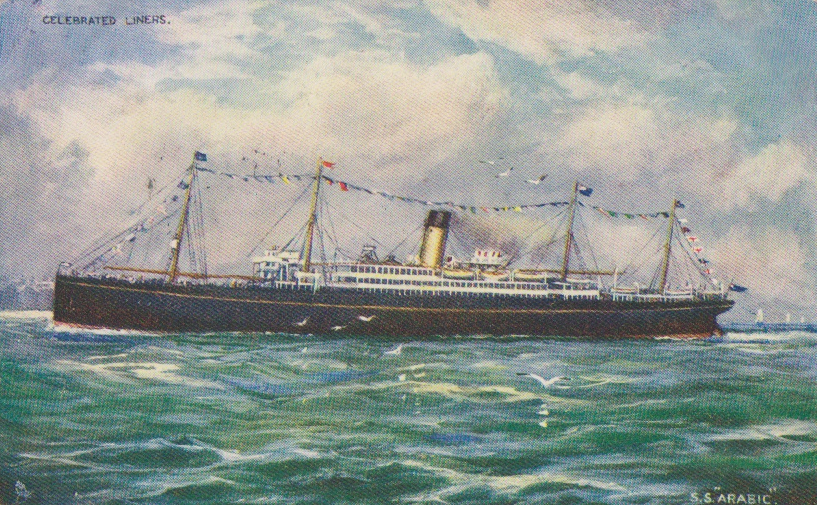

History
- Name: Arabic
- Owner: White Star Line
- Port of registry: Liverpool
- Route: Liverpool–Queenstown–New York City; Liverpool–Queenstown–Boston
- Builder: Harland and Wolff, Belfast
- Yard number: 340
- Launched: 18 December 1902
- Completed: 21 June 1903
- Maiden voyage: 26 June 1903
- Identification: UK official number 118023; Code letters VCNQ
- Fate: Torpedoed and sunk, 19 August 1915

General characteristics
- Type: Ocean liner
- Tonnage: 15,801 GRT; 10,062 NRT
- Length: 600.7 ft (183.1 m) between perpendiculars, 625 ft (191 m) overall
- Beam: 65.5 ft (20.0 m)
- Depth: 47.6 ft (14.5 m)
- Installed power: 1,228 nhp
- Propulsion: 2 × Harland and Wolff quadruple expansion steam engines; Twin propellers
- Speed: 16 kn (30 km/h)
- Capacity: 1,400 passengers: 200 first class, 200 second class, 1,000 third class

SS Arabic was a British-registered ocean liner that entered service in 1903 for the White Star Line. She was sunk on 19 August 1915, during the First World War, by German submarine SM U-24, 50 mi (80 km) south of Kinsale, causing a major diplomatic incident.

== Construction ==
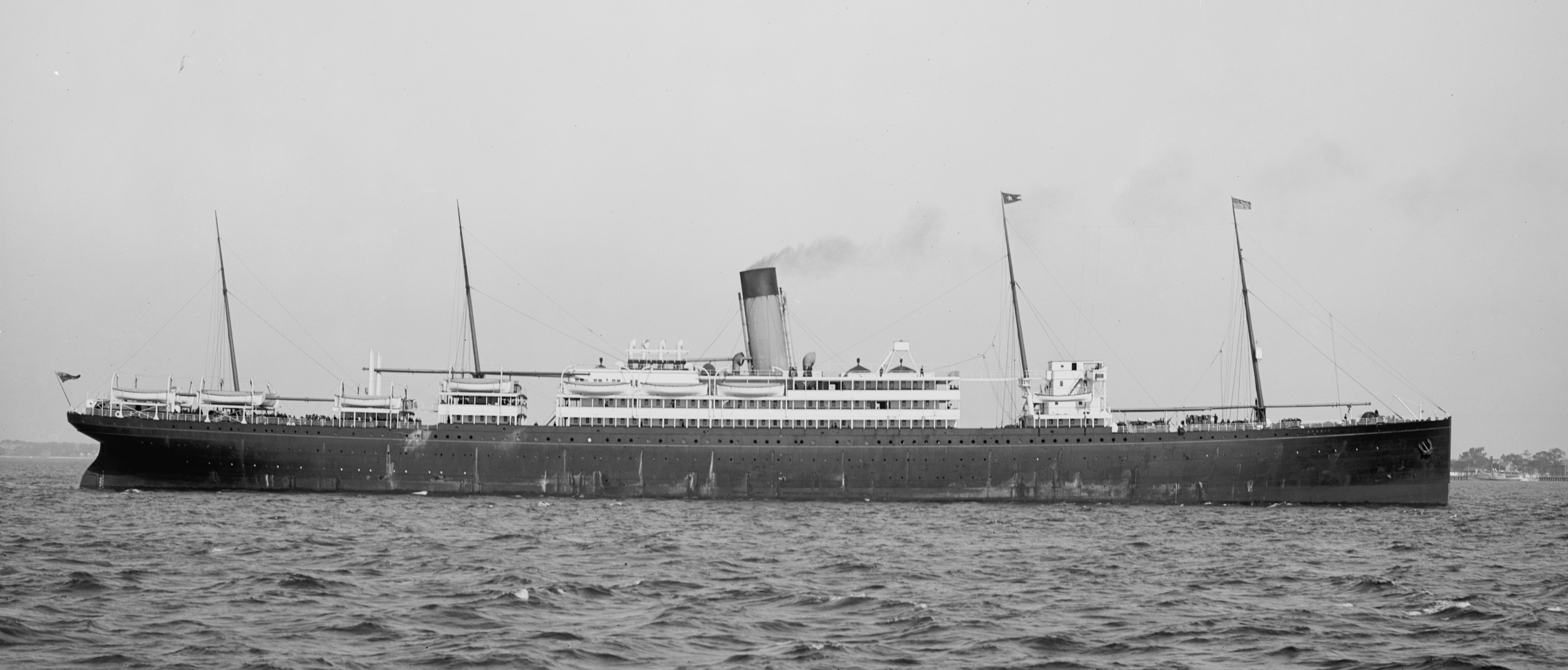
Arabic in about 1905

Arabic was originally intended to be Minnewaska, one of four ships ordered from Harland and Wolff, Belfast, by the Atlantic Transport Line (ATL), but fell victim to the recession and the shipbuilding rationalization following the ATL's 1902 incorporation into the IMM Co., and was transferred before completion to the White Star Line as Arabic. She was extensively modified before launch with additional accommodation, which extended her superstructure aft of her third mast and forward of her second mast. Arabic was fitted with twin-screw propellers driven by separate sets of quadruple expansion engines arranged on the builders' "balanced" principle. She had accommodations for 1,400 passengers; 200 in first class, 200 in second class and 1,000 in third class. Her accommodations were configured similar to most other White Star passenger ships, with first class amidships, second class abaft of first, and third class divided at the fore and after ends of the vessel. She was launched in Belfast on 18 December 1902.

== Career ==
Arabic commenced her maiden voyage from Liverpool to New York City via Queenstown on 26 June 1903, arriving in New York on 5 July, marking the beginning of a 12-year career during which she spent half on White Star's main route between Liverpool and New York, and the other half on White Star's secondary service to Boston, both of which included stops at Queenstown. She spent her first two years on the Liverpool–New York service before being transferred to the Boston route in April 1905, on which she sailed alongside Cymric and Republic for the next two years, while returning briefly to the New York route during the winter months.

In the late spring of 1907, the White Star Line started their new express service out of Southampton, to which they transferred Teutonic, Majestic, Oceanic and the newly completed Adriatic, after which Arabic was returned to the New York service to make up for this rearrangement. She remained on the New York service for the next four years, and after Olympic entered service in June 1911, she was again transferred back to the Boston route, on which she remained until White Star suspended their Liverpool–Boston service in November 1914 due to the escalation of the First World War, during which several of their ships were requisitioned by the Royal Navy. She was transferred back to the New York service in January 1915, on which she remained until the end of her career the following August.

Although her career was somewhat shorter than some of her company running mates, Arabic proved to be a popular addition to the White Star Fleet, as over the duration of her career she carried a total of 94,032 passengers westbound across the Atlantic; 48,655 on the New York service and 45,377 on the Boston service, as well as an additional 50,036 passengers eastbound to Liverpool, with 30,854 coming inbound from New York and 19,182 from Boston.

== Sinking and diplomatic crisis ==
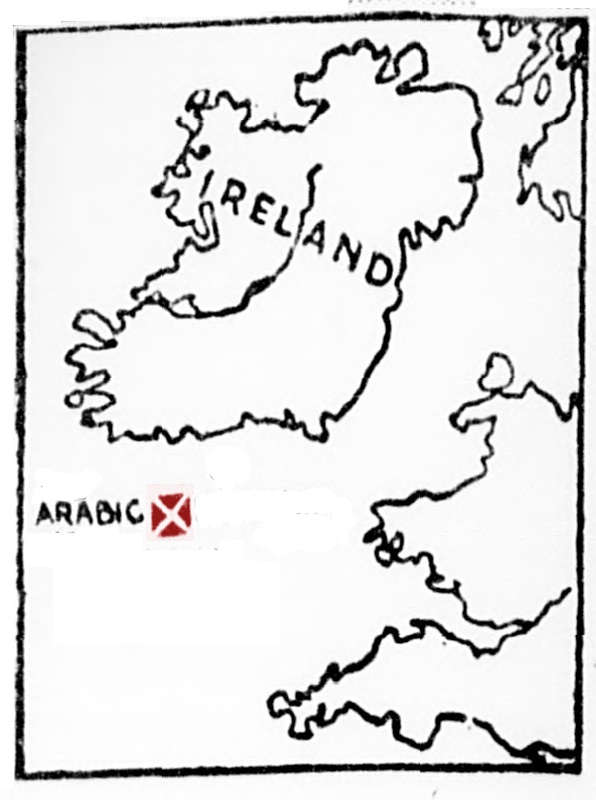
Contemporary map of the sinking location, marked with a red cross

On 19 August 1915, U-24 was operating south of Ireland. Two months previously, following the sinking of RMS Lusitania, the Kaiser had issued secret orders for U-boats to not attack large passenger vessels.

Arabic was sailing out from Liverpool to the United States. She was zigzagging when spotted by the German submarine, and Rudolf Schneider, commander of the sub, later said that he thought she was trying to ram his vessel. Without identifying his target, the U-boat submerged and attacked Arabic without warning, 50 mi (80 km) south of Kinsale. He fired a single torpedo which struck the liner aft, and she sank within 10 minutes, killing 44 passengers and crew, 3 of whom were American.

=== Arabic crisis ===
The US had still not fully resolved the dispute with Germany over RMS Lusitania. Indeed, the last note, of 21 July, that Wilson sent took the form of an ultimatum, to the effect that the US would regard any subsequent sinkings that harm American citizens as "deliberately unfriendly".

Advised by Colonel House, on 22 August President Wilson issued a statement via his press office to the effect that the White House staff was speculating on what to do if the Arabic investigation indicated that there had been a deliberate German attack. If true, there was speculation that the US would sever relations with Germany, while if it was untrue, negotiations were possible. Severing relations was understood to likely lead to war.

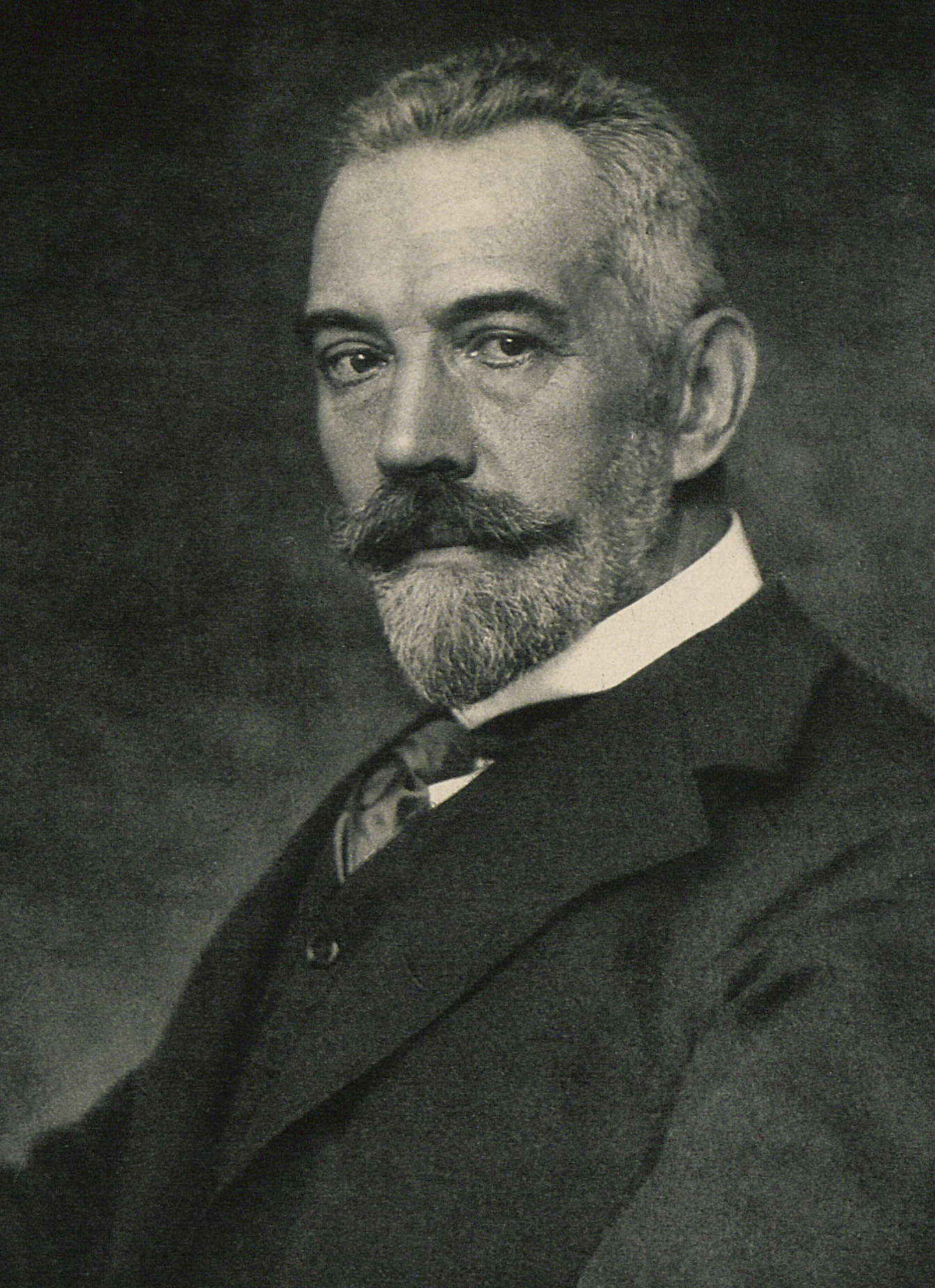
German Chancellor Bethmann Hollweg in 1914. Bethmann Hollweg was the main opponent of the unrestricted submarine war in the German government.

The attack was met with panic from German Chancellor Theobald von Bethmann Hollweg and the German Foreign Office under Gottlieb von Jagow. Senior staff at the Foreign Office wrote angrily: "The attacks on the SS Orduña and the Arabic prove that new incidents with America are possible at any time. [...] Both ships were torpedoed without previous warning while sailing *to* America. That the torpedo fired at the Orduna missed is only an accident." The fact that the ships were heading out from the UK undercut all of the German excuses about the Lusitania carrying munitions, and indicated that any submarine captain could cause war between Germany and the US at any time. The Chancellor and the Foreign Office agreed that cruiser rules with passenger ships was absolutely imperative.

Bethmann Hollweg and Jagow adopted a two-fold course. On 24 and 25 August, Jagow told US Ambassador James W. Gerard about the secret June 6 orders to not attack large passenger liners, breaking the Kaiser's instruction to keep the orders secret. Bethmann Hollweg arranged an August 26 conference with the major political and military leaders. The Chancellor furiously proposed new orders that all passenger ships, not just large ones, must be attacked only under cruiser rules. The Germans should accept arbitration over the damage caused. And they should work with the Americans to press the British to adhere to the Declaration of London and loosen the blockade. He was supported by Army leader Erich von Falkenhayn who considered American involvement to be disastrous, likely leading to other neutral countries joining the Entente as well. Meanwhile, Grand Admiral Tirpitz and Head of the Admiralty Staff Gustav Bachmann, naval leaders deeply involved in the submarine war, were opposed to all of the Chancellor's proposals. They argued that Germany must not make any admission that the submarine war was illegal, that any restriction on submarines is equivalent to abandonment of the campaign, and that Britain adopting the Declaration is undesirable because it would remove the German excuse for submarine warfare. Falkenhayn countered that the last six months showed the submarine to be simply not an effective weapon, and in a fury the Chancellor declared that he would not leave "until His Majesty had ruled in his favor".

Finally, the next day, the Chancellor used a belated telegram from Ambassador to the US Johann Heinrich von Bernstorff on the situation in America to get his way.

The Admiralty attempted a last stand. Bachmann refused to approve of the new direction. The Kaiser issued direct orders on a suspension of the submarine campaign and Bachmann was removed, to be replaced by Henning von Holtzendorff who was thought to be closer to the Chancellor. Tirpitz offered to resign his post as Naval Secretary and thus cause public outrage, but this was rejected, and instead his access to the Kaiser was strictly limited from this point on. Holtzendorff, taking over the Admiralty Staff, issued orders on 18 September that confined submarines to the North Sea, where they would only operate under cruiser rules. The first round of unrestricted submarine warfare was over.

=== Arabic pledge ===
Intrigue continued across the Atlantic. This had begun on August 23, with a meeting between Assistant Secretary Chandler Anderson (approved by US Secretary of State Robert Lansing) with Ambassador Bernstorff to explain informally that if Germany abandoned submarine warfare, Britain would be the only violator of American neutral rights. Anderson met Bernstorff at the Ritz Carlton Hotel in New York and reported to Lansing that Bernstorff had immediately recognized the advantage of making Britain responsible for illegal acts unless Britain ended its war zone. Bernstorff had in fact long opposed the submarine war. Lansing continued to put pressure on Bernstorff. Soon, the decision arrived from Germany, and Bernstoff was given instructions:

I empower you to negotiate confidentially with Wilson or Lansing on the following basis:

1. American demands for an indemnity for Lusitania and perhaps also Arabic incident will be decided by Hague Arbitration. Exclusively for personal information: In the arbitration agreement it will later have to be made clear that the judgement shall not include allowance or disallowance of the German submarine campaign.
2. Passenger liners will be sunk only after warning and the saving of human life, provided they do not flee or offer resistance; upon rejection of the term "liner", you will limit yourself to using, at the most, the expression "passenger ship". Should England, because of knowledge of this concession, abuse it, we reserve the right to have further talks with America. If you are asked to explain the word "abuse", then you should say that we would consider it an abuse if England tried to protect her freighters with single American passengers. Exclusively for your personal information: Assurances about enemy freighters cannot be given.
3. We expect efforts from the American side to re-establish the freedom of the seas, perhaps on the basis of the Declaration of London, and will be gladly willing to cooperate. If success ensues, we will conduct the submarine war only in accord with the Declaration of London. Otherwise, we reserve the right of decision.

After agreement on the above basis, I will answer the last Lusitania note, using your proposals. Wire notice of receipt.

— von Jagow

Bernstorff acted on the proposal on 1 September, giving the Arabic pledge:

Liners will not be sunk by our submarines without warning and without safety of the lives of noncombatants, provided that the liners do not try to escape or offer resistance.

— von Bernstorff

There remained one last issue - the Germans had not apologised or disavowed the sinking of the Arabic. On September 2, Commander Schneider, having returned to port, wrote a report defending his actions as believing he was going to be rammed. The German authorities accepted Schneider's account, keen to avoid new conflict with the Navy. On September 6, U-20 (the same culprit behind the Lusitania incident) sunk the outward-bound hospital ship RMS Hesperian, and then the Americans received a note on the next day defending Schneider and thus refusing to formally disavow his actions. Taken together, this appeared to the Americans to be a repudiation of the week-old Arabic pledge and caused a new crisis. While the Hesperian crisis was defused by the Germans lying and claiming there were no submarines operating in the area, the British crew of the Arabic said under oath that they were not attempting to ram, and the Foreign Office decided to accept their testimony while still refusing to disavow Schneider and "dishonor" the Navy.

Confronted with American anger, Bernstorff took an extraordinary move. Retreating to his office, he pretended that the German government had accepted American demands, editing the statement he had composed according to Foreign Office instructions into an explicit disavowal of Schneider. The edited statement now read "The German Government regrets and disavows this act and notified Commander Schneider accordingly".

Washington was satisfied with this response. The Chancellor only found out on October 26, at which point the reaction from America was such that the Foreign Office could only issue a cleverly veiled response to satisfy the Navy, and reprimand Bernstorff strongly in secret.
