= SS Torrington =

British turret deck ship sunk by a U-boat in 1917

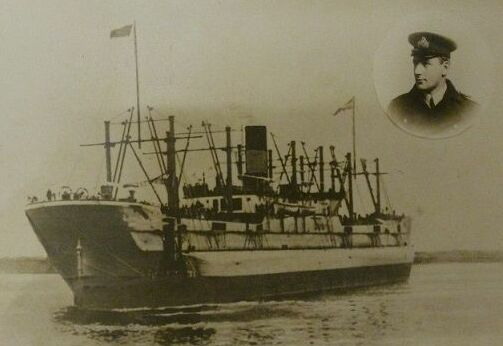
- Torrington, with Captain Starkey inset top right

History

United Kingdom
- Name: Torrington
- Owner: 1905: Torrington SS Co Ltd; 1910: Tatem SN Co Ltd
- Operator: William J Tatem Ltd
- Port of registry: Cardiff
- Builder: William Doxford & Sons, Sunderland
- Yard number: 332
- Launched: 21 March 1905
- Completed: April 1905
- Identification: UK official number 119969; code letters HCLV
- Fate: Sunk, 8 April 1917

General characteristics
- Type: turret deck ship
- Tonnage: 5,597 GRT, 3,619 NRT
- Length: 390.3 ft (119.0 m)
- Beam: 55.2 ft (16.8 m)
- Depth: 27.2 ft (8.3 m)
- Decks: 1
- Installed power: 359 NHP
- Propulsion: triple-expansion engine
- Speed: 10 knots (19 km/h; 12 mph)
- Crew: 35
- Notes: sister ship: Wellington

SS Torrington was a British cargo steamship that was built in England in 1905, owned and registered in Wales, and sunk by a German U-boat in 1917. She was a turret deck ship: an unusual hull design that was developed by William Doxford & Sons of Sunderland in the 1890s.

In April 1917 U-55 sank Torrington in the Celtic Sea southwest of the Isles of Scilly. Her crew survived the sinking, but U-55's commander Wilhelm Werner murdered many of them by drowning. Werner evaded prosecution, later became a senior officer in the Schutzstaffel, and died just after the Second World War.

== Building and registration ==
In 1905 Doxford's built a pair of sister ships at their Pallion shipyard. Yard number 330 was launched on 21 February, completed in March and named Wellington. Yard number 332 was launched on 21 March, completed in April and named Torrington. Each ship had a registered length of 390.3 ft (119.0 m), beam of 55.2 ft (16.8 m) and depth of 27.2 ft (8.3 m). Torrington's tonnages were 5,597 GRT and 3,619 NRT.

Each ship had a three-cylinder triple-expansion engine that was rated at 359 nominal horsepower. This would have given them a speed of about 10 knots (19 km/h; 12 mph).

William J Tatem and Company, Limited managed both ships. Tatem created two one-ship companies to own the ships: the Wellington Steam Ship Company and the Torrington Steam Ship Company. Tatem registered each ship in Cardiff. Torrington's UK official number was 119969 and her code letters were HCLV.

In 1910 Tatem transferred ownership of both Wellington and Torrington to the Tatem Steam Navigation Company Limited. WJ Tatem & Co remained the manager of both ships.

== Sinking ==
Early in 1917 Torrington took coal from Wales to Savona, Italy, for Italian State Railways. On 8 April 1917 she was returning to Barry for her next cargo. At about 11.30 am, at a position around 150 nautical miles (280 km; 170 mi) southwest of the Scillies, her lookout sighted lifeboats in the distance. Torrington's captain, Anthony Starkey, changed course toward the boats, which carried survivors of Umvoti, a Bullard, King & Co steamship that U-55 had sunk.

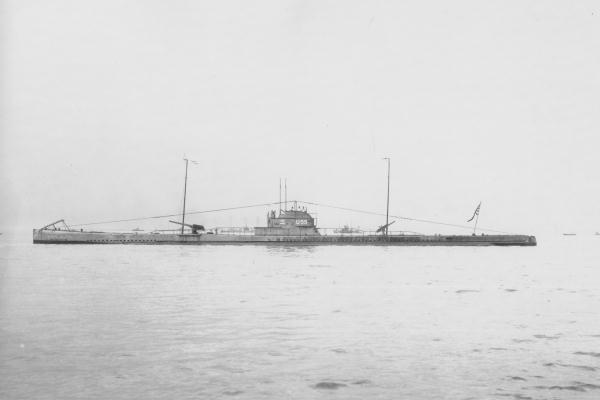
U-55 in 1919

U-55 then fired a torpedo at Torrington. Starkey saw it and changed course in response, but failed to avoid it. It hit hold number 3 just forward of the bridge, quickly flooding both that hold and hold number two further forward. This put Torrington down by her bow, lifting her propeller out of the water and bringing her to a halt.

U-55 surfaced off Torrington's starboard bow. Torrington was defensively armed with a naval gun on her poop, Torrington's superstructure amidships blocked it from being brought to bear on the U-boat. Starkey surrendered, ordered Torrington's Red Ensign to be lowered and ordered his crew to abandon ship. Starkey took command of 20 men in the starboard lifeboat, while his chief officer commanded 15 men in the port lifeboat.

Having pulled one-quarter nautical mile (0.46 km; 0.29 mi) from Torrington, U-55 fired a shell from her deck gun that exploded above Starkey's lifeboat. Starkey moved the boat to the submarine and those aboard were ordered onto its deck. Werner took Starkey below for interrogation. Werner accused Starkey of lying by stating that he was captain, as Werner's copy of Lloyd's Register of Shipping named a different man. Starkey had been appointed only four months prior, and the register was out of date. Werner asked Starkey about the crew of the defensive gun. Starkey indicated they were among the 20 men on his lifeboat. When asked why they were not wearing uniform Starkey, said they had not had time to change before sinking.

Werner told Starkey he was "a damned pirate" and that he deserved "to be shot, and as for the others, let them swim". Starkey assumed the latter was a German expression and assumed his men had been allowed to reboard their boat and continue at sea. But U-55 submerged with the men still on her deck, and all were drowned. The fate of the port boat is not known, but it is thought to have also been sunk by Werner. Starkey remained aboard U-55 for the remaining 15 days of its cruise, and was then interned in Germany.

During the trip a German sailor asked Starkey if he thought his crew had survived. Starkey said he thought they would as the weather was not poor. The sailor then told Starkey that he knew all his crew had died, but could not tell him more in front of the other Germans. Another sailor told Starkey that the event was "not war, it was murder". Whilst aboard Starkey, later noted that he had seen two other British ships sunk and their crews murdered. U-55 reached Germany on 23 April after a cruise in which she sank 10 ships, totalling 29,568 GRT, and killed 100 seafarers. Starkey was held in an internment camp and thought he had only been allowed to live because Werner did not suspect he knew the truth about the murders.

== Later events ==
Later in the war Werner and U-55 sank the hospital ship HMHS Rewa and fired at the hospital ship Guildford Castle with a torpedo that failed to explode. On 31 July 1917 he murdered most of the crew of the Prince Line cargo ship Belgian Prince in a similar manner to that of the crew of Torrington, but three men survived as witnesses.

After the war the Attorney General for England and Wales confirmed to families of the Torrington crew that it intended to pursue the trial of Werner for murder at the Leipzig war crimes trials, but he could not be found. He had fled to Brazil, but he returned to Germany in 1924, and the charges against him were dropped by a German court in 1926. He later joined the Nazi Party and served in the Schutzstaffel, and was promoted to the rank of Brigadeführer in Heinrich Himmler's personal staff. Werner died in May 1945, shortly after the end of World War II in Europe.

== Bibliography ==
- Bridgland, Tony (2002). Outrage at Sea: Naval Atrocities of the First World War. Barnsley: Pen and Sword. ISBN 978-1-78337-938-5.
- Edwards, Bernard (2010). War Under the Red Ensign, 1914–1918. Havertown, PA: Casemate Publishers. ISBN 978-1-84468-486-1.
- Home Waters—Part VIII, December 1916 to April 1917, Monograph No. 34 (PDF). Naval Staff Monographs (Historical). Vol. XVIII. Naval Staff, Training and Staff Duties Division. 1933. pp. 406–407 – via Royal Australian Navy.
- Lloyd's Register of British and Foreign Shipping. Vol. I–Steamers. London: Lloyd's Register of Shipping. 1905 – via Internet Archive.
- Lloyd's Register of British and Foreign Shipping. Vol. I–Steamers. London: Lloyd's Register of Shipping. 1910 – via Internet Archive.
- Mercantile Navy List. London. 1906 – via Crew List Index Project.
- Mercantile Navy List. London. 1911 – via Crew List Index Project.
- Winton, John (1983). Convoy: The Defence of Sea Trade, 1890-1990. London: Michael Joseph. p. 59. ISBN 978-0-7181-2163-1.
