= SS Belgian Prince =

British cargo steamship launched in 1900 and sunk by a U-boat in 1917

History

United Kingdom
- Name: Mohawk
- Namesake: Mohawk people
- Owner: 1901: Menantic SS Co Ltd; 1902: N Atlantic SS Co Ltd; 1912: Prince Line
- Operator: 1901: T Hogan & Sons; 1912: James Knott; 1916: Furness, Withy
- Port of registry: 1901: Bristol; 1912: Newcastle upon Tyne
- Builder: Sir James Laing & Sons, Sunderland
- Yard number: 578
- Launched: 8 November 1900
- Completed: 4 February 1901
- Identification: UK official number 111307; code letters SFPR
- Fate: Torpedoed and scuttled, 1917

General characteristics
- Tonnage: 4,765 GRT, 3,129 NRT
- Length: 391.1 ft (119.2 m)
- Beam: 51.2 ft (15.6 m)
- Draught: 27 ft 9 in (8.46 m)
- Depth: 28.5 ft (8.7 m)
- Decks: 2
- Installed power: 492 NHP
- Propulsion: 1 × screw; 1 × triple expansion engine
- Speed: 10.5 knots (19 km/h)
- Crew: 42
- Notes: sister ships: Mineola, Monomoy, Manitoba

SS Belgian Prince was a British cargo steamship that was launched in 1900 as Mohawk. She was renamed Hungarian Prince when she changed owners in 1912, and Belgian Prince after the United Kingdom declared war against Austria-Hungary and its allies in 1914.

U-55 sank Belgian Prince in 1917. Her crew survived the sinking, but U-55's commander Wilhelm Werner murdered most of them by drowning. Werner evaded prosecution, later became a senior officer in the SS, and died just after the Second World War.

She was the third of three Prince Line ships to be called Belgian Prince. The first was launched in 1888 as Lady Ailsa, renamed Belgian Prince in 1890, and sold and renamed in 1897. The second was launched in 1885 as Hajeen, renamed Berriz in 1900 and Belgian Prince in 1907, and sold and renamed again in 1911.

== Four sister ships ==
In 1900 and 1901 two Sunderland shipbuilders built four sister ships for the Menantic Steamship Company. Sir James Laing & Sons launched Mineola and Mohawk at their Deptford shipyard in 1900. J.L. Thompson and Sons launched the almost identical Monomoy and Manitoba at their North Sands shipyard in 1901.

Mohawk was launched on 8 November 1900 and completed on 4 February 1901. Her registered length was 391.1 ft (119.2 m), her beam was 51.2 ft (15.6 m) and her depth was 28.5 ft (8.7 m). Her tonnages were 4,765 GRT and 3,129 NRT.

She had a single screw, driven by a three-cylinder triple expansion engine built by Blair & Co of Stockton-on-Tees. It was rated at 492 NHP and gave her a speed of 10.5 knots (19 km/h). She also had four masts.

The Menantic Steamship Co was managed by T Hogan & Sons of New York. Menantic gave each of its ships a name beginning with "M", in most cases derived from the name of a place or people of the Indigenous peoples of the Eastern Woodlands of North America. It named Mohawk after the Mohawk people.

Menantic registered Mohawk at Bristol. Her UK official number was 111307 and her code letters were SFPR.

== Changes of ownership and name ==
Menantic sold Manitoba almost as soon as she was built in 1901. In 1902 Menantic became the North Atlantic Steamship Co, still with T Hogan & Sons managing its ships. In 1912 North Atlantic's entire fleet was sold. James Knott's Prince Line bought Mineola, Mohawk and Monomoy, and renamed them Bulgarian Prince, Hungarian Prince, Austrian Prince respectively. It also bought a slightly smaller North Atlantic ship called Matteawan, and renamed her Highland Prince. Prince Line registered the ships at Newcastle-upon-Tyne.

In 1914 Austria-Hungary attacked Serbia, Germany invaded Belgium, and the UK declared war on the Central Powers. In October 1915 Bulgaria joined the Central Powers. Prince Line duly renamed Bulgarian Prince, Hungarian Prince, Austrian Prince as French Prince, Belgian Prince and Servian Prince respectively.

James Knott had three sons, two of whom were senior managers of Prince Line. All three were commissioned into the British Army in the First World War. In 1915 the youngest was killed at Ypres and the eldest was listed as missing in the Gallipoli campaign. On 1 July 1916 the middle son was killed on the first day of the Battle of the Somme. In August 1916 James Knott sold Prince Line to Furness, Withy & Co.

== Loss ==
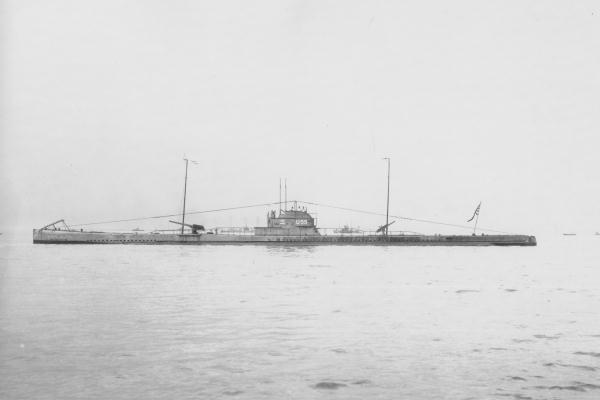
SM U-55 in 1918

On 15 February 1917 the German auxiliary cruiser SMS Möwe captured and scuttled French Prince. At 19:50 hrs on 31 July the same year Belgian Prince was steaming from Liverpool to Newport News carrying blue clay when U-55 torpedoed her in the Western Approaches, about 175 nautical miles (324 km) northwest by west of Tory Island, at position 55°50′N 13°20′W. The torpedo hit her port side aft, in way of her Number 5 hold. She did not sink, but was badly damaged and listing to port.

All 42 of Belgian Prince's crew abandoned ship in three lifeboats. U-55 surfaced, started shelling the ship, and then came round to her starboard side and started machine-gunning her. The U-boat then approached the three lifeboats. Its commander, Wilhelm Werner, ordered survivors out of the boats and onto the deck of the U-boat.

Belgian Prince's Master, Captain Henry Hassan, was taken below. It was common for shipmasters to be taken for questioning, and sometimes kept prisoner. But Hassan was never seen again, and U-55's log has no record of him being taken prisoner.

Werner ordered Belgian Prince's crew to take off their lifejackets. His crew searched the survivors, and kicked most of their lifejackets into the sea. Under Werner's orders, the U-boat crew then removed emergency supplies from the lifeboats, and damaged the two larger boats with axes to make them sink. The U-boat crew kept one small boat, with which five of them rowed to the damaged ship. Belgian Prince's Chief Engineer, Thomas Bowman, reported that he saw them board the ship and signal to U-55 with a flash lamp.

U-55 then cast the damaged boats adrift, the U-boat crew went below and closed the hatch, and the U-boat motored away for about 2 nautical miles (4 km). At about 22:00 hrs U-55 submerged, plunging 41 of Belgian Prince's crew into the sea.

38 of the crew drowned overnight. Three men survived: Bowman, a Russian able seaman called George Silenski, and the Second Cook, an African American called William Snell. Bowman was dragged underwater as the U-boat submerged, but he resurfaced. He saw only about a dozen other men still afloat, including a 16-year-old apprentice, who was shouting for help. Bowman kept him afloat until about midnight, when the boy died of hypothermia. Belgian Prince was carrying four teenage apprentices. Three were 17 years old. The 16-year-old was Edward Sharp.

Silenski managed to swim back to Belgian Prince and re-board her. He reported that on the morning of 1 August, U-55 fired two rounds at the ship from her deck gun. Snell was one of the few who had managed to hide his lifejacket from the U-boat crew. He swam toward Belgian Prince, but in the morning, when he was still about 1 nautical mile (2 km) distant, he saw the ship explode, break in two, and sink. U-55's log records that the boarding party sank her with scuttling charges.

In daylight on 1 August a British patrol boat rescued Bowman, Silenski and Snell from the water, and landed them at Derry, where a Sailors' Rest run by the British & Foreign Sailors' Society took care of them.

== Wilhelm Werner ==
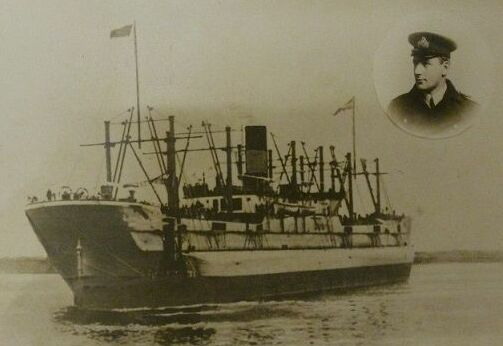
Torrington, which Wilhelm Werner had sunk on 8 April 1917

On 8 April 1917 Werner and U-55 had sunk the British cargo ship Torrington, and had drowned 20 of her crew in the same way as the men from Belgian Prince. Later in the war Werner and U-55 sank the hospital ship HMHS Rewa and fired at the hospital ship Guildford Castle with a torpedo that failed to explode.

After the war it was proposed to try Werner at the Leipzig war crimes trials for the murder of the crew of Torrington, but he could not be found. He had fled to Brazil, but he returned to Germany in 1924, and the charges against him were dropped by a German court in 1926.

Werner later joined the Nazi Party and served in the SS, and was promoted to the rank of Brigadeführer in Heinrich Himmler's personal staff. Werner died in May 1945, shortly after the end of World War II in Europe.

== Bibliography ==
- Bridgland, Tony (2002). Outrage at Sea: Naval Atrocities of the First World War. Barnsley: Pen and Sword. ISBN 978-1-78337-938-5.
- Burrell, David (1992). Furness Withy 1891–1991. Kendal: World Ship Society. ISBN 0-905617-70-3.
- Lloyd's Register of British and Foreign Shipping. Vol. I.–Steamers. London: Lloyd's Register of Shipping. 1901 – via Internet Archive.
- Lloyd's Register of British and Foreign Shipping. Vol. I.–Steamers. London: Lloyd's Register of Shipping. 1902 – via Internet Archive.
- Lloyd's Register of British and Foreign Shipping. Vol. II.–Steamers. London: Lloyd's Register of Shipping. 1912 – via Internet Archive.
- Lloyd's Register of Shipping. Vol. II.–Steamers. London: Lloyd's Register of Shipping. 1917 – via Internet Archive.
- Mercantile Navy List. London. 1902 – via Crew List Index Project.
- Mercantile Navy List. London. 1913 – via Crew List Index Project.
