= SS Barlind =

German-built cargo steamship

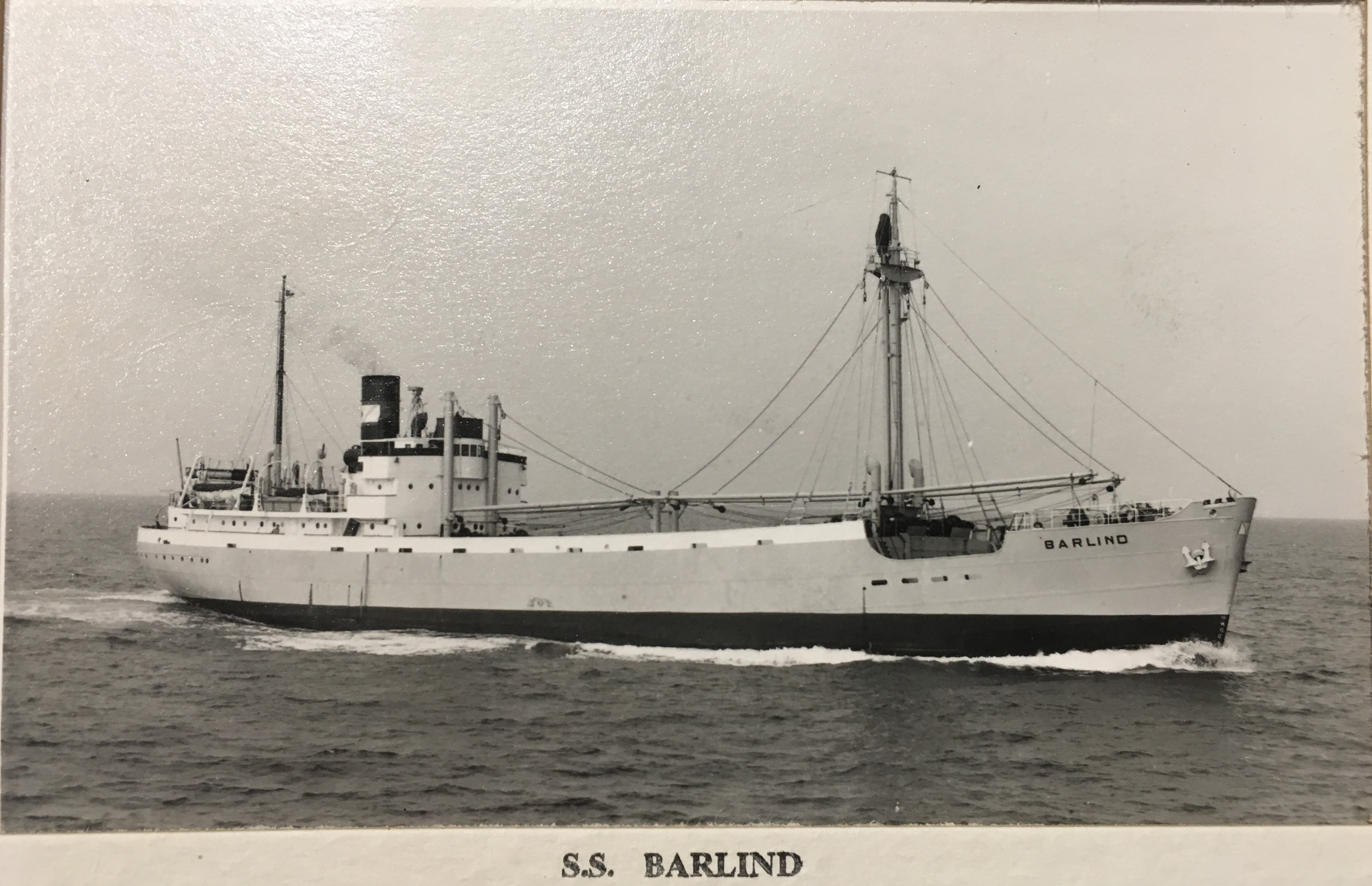
- Barlind under way

History
- Name: 1938: Süderau; 1945: Empire Content; 1946: Svartnes; 1947: Barlind; 1971: Ikaria
- Namesake: 1938: Süderau; 1946: Svartnes; 1947: Norwegian for "yew"; 1971: Icaria
- Owner: 1938: Bugsier-, Reederei- und Bergungsgesellschaft; 1945: Ministry of War Transport; 1945: Ministry of Transport; 1946: Dir for Enemy Property; 1947: A/S Ganger Rolf; 1971: Pokat Cia Nav SA
- Operator: 1945: Gillespie & Nichol Ltd; 1947: Fred. Olsen & Co.; 1971: LN Pothas
- Port of registry: 1938: (Nazi Germany) Hamburg; 1945: (United Kingdom) London; 1946: (Norway) Oslo; 1971: (Greece) Piraeus
- Builder: DeSchiMAG Seebeck, Wesermünde
- Launched: 1938
- Completed: January 1939
- Identification: 1938: call sign DJYQ; 1945: UK official number 180645; 1945: call sign GJBK; 1946: call sign LLTZ; IMO number: 5036937
- Fate: Scrapped, 1972

General characteristics
- Type: coastal steamship
- Tonnage: 1,453 GRT; 713 NRT; 2,110 DWT
- Length: 274 ft 3 in (83.59 m) overall; 260.7 ft (79.5 m) registered
- Beam: 41.5 ft (12.6 m)
- Depth: 14.3 ft (4.4 m)
- Decks: 1
- Installed power: 1 × compound engine + exhaust steam turbine; 209 NHP
- Propulsion: 1 × screw
- Sensors & processing systems: as built: wireless direction finding; by 1951: radar added; by 1959: echo sounding device and gyrocompass added
- Notes: sister ship: Norderau

SS Barlind was a steam coaster. She was built in Germany in 1938 for a German shipowner, who named her Süderau. In 1945 the Allies seized her; the UK Ministry of War Transport took possession of her; and she was renamed Empire Content. In 1946 she was transferred the Norwegian Directorate for Enemy Property, and renamed Svartnes. In 1947 she joined the fleet of Fred. Olsen & Co. and was renamed Barlind. In 1971 a Greek owner bought her and renamed her Ikaria. She was bought by Italian ship breakers in 1972.

== Building ==
In 1938, Deutsche Schiff- und Maschinenbau's Seebeck shipyard in Wesermünde, Bremerhaven, built a pair of identical sister ships named Norderau and Süderau for Bugsier-, Reederei- und Bergungsgesellschaft. Süderau was completed in January 1939. Her lengths were 274 ft 3 in (83.59 m) overall and 260.7 ft (79.5 m) registered. Her beam was 41.5 ft (12.6 m) and her depth was 14.3 ft (4.4 m). Her tonnages were 1,453 GRT; 713 NRT; and 2,110 DWT.

She had a single screw, and her main propulsion was a two-cylinder compound engine, made by DeSchiMAG Seebeck at Wesermünde. It was augmented by an exhaust steam turbine, which drove the same propeller shaft via double-reduction gearing and a Föttinger fluid coupling. The combined power of her reciprocating engine plus turbine was rated at 209 NHP. As built, she was equipped with wireless direction finding. Her stokehold; engine room; superstructure; bridge; and single funnel were all aft. She had a raked stem; cruiser stern; two masts; and a short well deck forward of her mainmast.

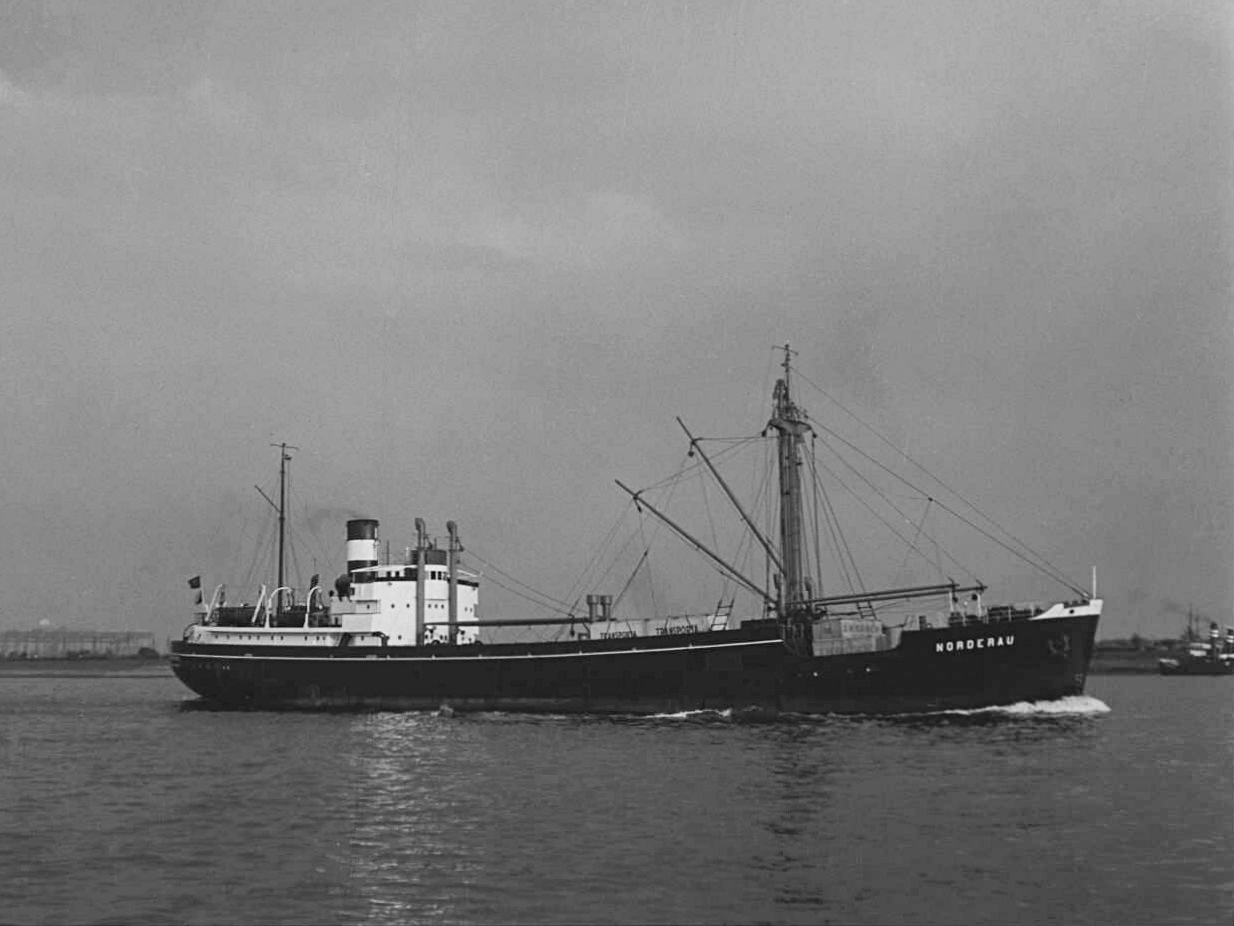
Süderau's sister ship Norderau in Bugsier-, Reederei- und Bergungsgesellschaft colours

== Career ==
Bugsier registered Süderau at Hamburg. Her wireless telegraph call sign was DJYQ. In May 1945 the Allies seized her at Bremerhaven. The UK Ministry of War Transport took ownership of her; renamed her Empire Content; and registered her in London. Her UK official number was 180645, and her call sign was GJBK. Gillespie and Nichol Ltd managed her for the MoWT, and for the Ministry of Transport which succeeded the MoWT.

In 1946 the ship was transferred to the Norwegian Direktoratet for fiendtlig eiendom ("Directorate for Enemy Property"), who renamed her Svartnes. She was registered in Oslo, and her call sign was LLTZ. In 1947 A/S Ganger Rolf acquired her; renamed her Barlind, and Fred. Olsen & Co. became her managers. By 1951, radar had been added to her navigating equipment. By 1954, she was equipped to burn bunker oil. By 1959, she was equipped with an echo sounding device; gyrocompass; and radiotelephone.

In April 1971, Pokat Compania Nav SA bought the ship and renamed her Ikaria. She was registered in Piraeus, and Leonidas N Pothas managed her. In 1972 she was sold to ship breakers in Greece.

== Bibliography ==
- Lloyd's Register of Shipping (PDF). Vol. II.–Steamers and Motorships of 300 tons. Trawlers, tugs, dredgers, Etc. London: Lloyd's Register of Shipping. 1939 – via Southampton City Council.
- Lloyd's Register of Shipping (PDF). Vol. I.–Steamers and Motorships of 300 tons. Trawlers, tugs, dredgers, Etc. London: Lloyd's Register of Shipping. 1940 – via Southampton City Council.
- Lloyd's Register of Shipping (PDF). Vol. I.–Steamers and Motorships of 300 tons gross and over. London: Lloyd's Register of Shipping. 1945 – via Southampton City Council.
- Lloyd's Register of Shipping. Vol. I.–Steamers and Motorships of 300 tons gross and over. London: Lloyd's Register of Shipping. 1947 – via Internet Archive.
- Lloyd's Register of Shipping. Vol. I.–Steamers and Motorships of 300 tons gross and over. London: Lloyd's Register of Shipping. 1948 – via Internet Archive.
- Mitchell, WH; Sawyer, LA (1995). The Empire Ships. London, New York, Hamburg, Hong Kong: Lloyd's of London Press Ltd. ISBN 1-85044-275-4.
- Register Book. Vol. I. A–L. London: Lloyd's Register of Shipping. 1951 – via Internet Archive.
- Register Book. Vol. I. A–L. London: Lloyd's Register of Shipping. 1954 – via Internet Archive.
- Register Book. Vol. I. Register of Ships. London: Lloyd's Register of Shipping. 1959 – via Internet Archive.
