= SS Keltier =

History

Belgium
- Name: Keltier
- Owner: Cie. Maritime Belge - CMB - Lloyd Royal S.A.
- Port of registry: Sunderland, United Kingdom
- Builder: Thompson Robert & Sons Ltd.
- Yard number: 282
- Launched: 4 July 1913
- Completed: August 1913
- Fate: Torpedoed and sunk 2 October 1918

General characteristics
- Type: Cargo ship
- Tonnage: 2,360 GRT
- Length: 91.44 metres (300 ft)
- Beam: 13.72 metres (45 ft)
- Installed power: Triple expansion steam engine
- Propulsion: Screw propeller
- Speed: 10 knots
- Crew: 25

SS Keltier was a Belgian cargo ship that was torpedoed by U-55 in the Atlantic Ocean while she was travelling from Milford Haven, Wales, United Kingdom, to New York, United States, in ballast.

== Construction ==
Keltier was constructed in 1913 with yard no. 282 at the Thompson Robert & Sons Ltd. shipyard in Sunderland, United Kingdom. She was completed in 1913 and sailed under the Belgian flag until her sinking in 1918.

The ship was 91.44 metres (300 ft) long, with a beam of 13.72 metres (45 ft). The ship was assessed at 2,360 GRT. She had a triple expansion steam engine driving a single screw propeller.

== The 1916 incident ==
On 7 December 1916, SS Keltier was torpedoed by UB-29 in the Atlantic Ocean, 40 nautical miles (74 km) west of the Isles of Scilly, United Kingdom. She was badly damaged but remained afloat long enough to reach safe waters. She was then towed to Falmouth, Cornwall, where she was beached at the East side of the harbour entrance. She was repaired shortly after and returned to service on 12 December 1916. There were no casualties.

== The sinking ==
Keltier left Milford Haven on 29 September 1918 for New York in ballast in a convoy. She was last seen leaving the convoy on 1 October 1918. The following day, Keltier was struck by a torpedo from U-55 in the North Atlantic. The 25 crew members took to the lifeboats and left the ship, but were never heard from or seen again.

== Wreck ==
The wreck lies at 46°16′N 9°52′W in the North Atlantic.
