= Wilhelm Werner =

German naval and SS officer (1888–1945)

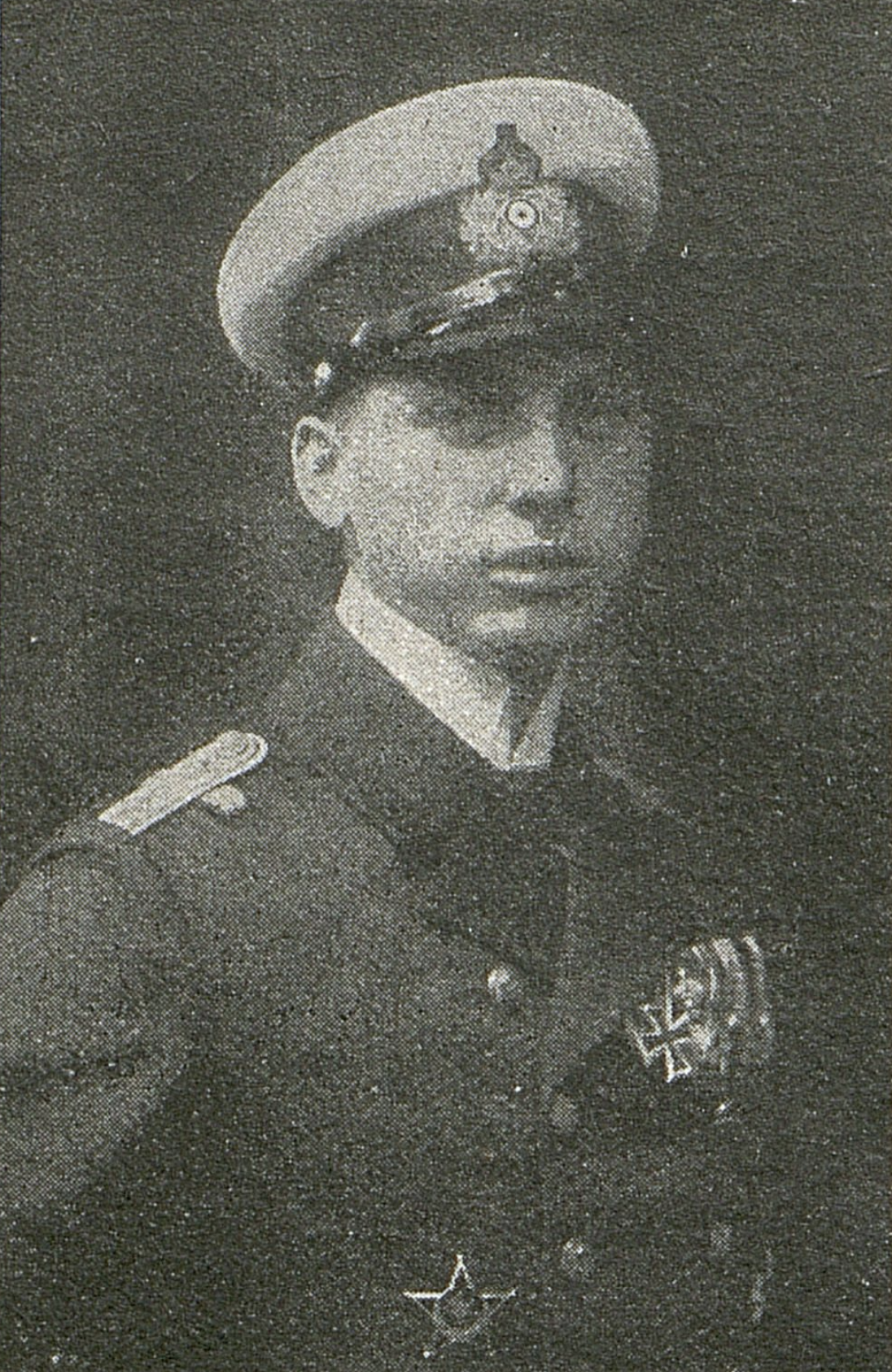
- Born: 6 June 1888; Apolda, Saxe-Weimar-Eisenach, German Empire (now Thuringia, Germany)
- Died: 14 May 1945 (aged 56); Falkenau, Saxony, Allied-occupied Germany
- Military career
- Allegiance: German Empire (1905–1918); Nazi Germany (1931–1945)
- Branch: Imperial German Navy (1905–1918); Schutzstaffel (1931–1945)
- Service years: 1905–1918; 1931–1945
- Rank: Kapitänleutnant (Imperial German Navy); SS-Brigadeführer
- Commands: SM U-55
- Conflicts: World War I; World War II
- Awards: Pour le Mérite; House Order of Hohenzollern; Iron Cross, 1st Class and 2nd Class

Wilhelm Werner (6 June 1888 – 14 May 1945) was a German naval officer in the First World War and SS staff general in the Second World War. As commander of U-55 during World War I he participated in several controversial actions, including the murder by drowning of surrendered crews of some of the ships he sank and attacks on marked hospital ships. The British government sought to prosecute Werner at the Leipzig war crimes trials, but he fled to Brazil, where he was reported to have worked as an architect and a coffee planter.

Werner returned to Germany in 1924, and two years later a German court dismissed the charges against him. He joined the Nazi Party, securing a seat for them in the Reichstag and joined the paramilitary Schutzstaffel (SS). Werner rose to the rank of SS-Brigadeführer (equivalent to brigadier general) and during the Second World War served on the personal staff of Heinrich Himmler.

== Early life and First World War ==
Werner was born on 6 June 1888 at Apolda, Saxe-Weimar-Eisenach (now Thuringia). He attended high school in Weimar before joining the Imperial German Navy in 1905. Werner was promoted to lieutenant in 1908, and commanded U-boats during the First World War.

On 8 April 1917, while commanding U-55, Werner murdered members of the crew of the British cargo ship Torrington. U-55 had struck Torrington with a torpedo and her crew had surrendered. Werner took her captain on board for interrogation and deliberately left 19 of her crew on deck when he submerged, drowning them. The fate of the remaining 15 crew in a separate lifeboat is not known, but they also did not survive. Torrington's captain remained aboard U-55 for the rest of her cruise and after the war claimed to have witnessed the murders of two other British crews.

On 31 July 1917, in a later cruise, U-55 sank Belgian Prince; her crew were taken onto the deck of the submarine, where Werner ordered them to take off their life jackets and overcoats, and scuttled the lifeboats with axes. U-55 then submerged, drowning all but three of Belgian Prince's crew. Later in the war Werner and U-55 sank the British hospital ship Rewa and fired upon the hospital ship Guildford Castle with a torpedo that failed to explode. By early 1918 he held the rank of Kapitänleutnant (equivalent to lieutenant commander).

For his actions in the war Werner was awarded the House Order of Hohenzollern, the Iron Cross first and second class and, on 18 August 1918, the Pour le Mérite. He also received a number of other German, Bulgarian and Turkish medals.

== Weimar and Nazi Germany ==
After the war the British government laid charges against Werner for the murders, the sinking of merchant ships without prior warning and the attacks on the hospital ships. They later agreed to drop most of the charges, leaving only those for the murders of Torrington's crew. Charges were to be brought at the Leipzig war crimes trials, but Werner fled to Brazil. He was reported to have worked on a coffee plantation and as an architect in São Paulo. Werner returned to Germany in 1924, and the Reich Court at Leipzig dismissed the charges against him in 1926, as was the German government's practice for outstanding war crimes cases.

Werner joined the paramilitary Freikorps and, from 1925, managed a manor at Falkenau. Werner enthusiastically joined the Nazi Party in September 1930. He was commissioned into the party's paramilitary Schutzstaffel (SS) in 1931, and ordered to establish the organisation in Upper Silesia.

Werner became a Kreisdeputierter (a district administrator) of the Grottkau district in June 1933. At the November 1933 parliamentary election, he was elected as a Nazi Party deputy to the Reichstag for electoral constituency 9, Oppeln, and retained this seat until his death. By 1936, he had reached the rank of SS-Brigadeführer (equivalent to brigadier general) and during the Second World War served on Heinrich Himmler's personal staff.

Werner died at his home in Falkenau on 14 May 1945, days after the end of the war in Europe.
