= SM U-55 =

German U-Boat, known for sinking RMS Carpathia

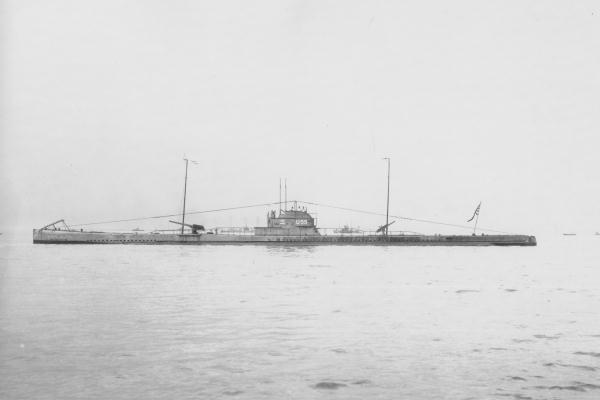
- SM U-55 in Yokosuka

History

German Empire
- Name: U-55
- Ordered: 23 August 1914
- Builder: Germaniawerft, Kiel
- Yard number: 237
- Laid down: 28 December 1914
- Launched: 18 March 1916
- Commissioned: 8 June 1916
- Renamed: O-3 in 1920; Auxiliary Vessel No. 2538 in 1923
- Fate: Surrendered to Japan on 26 November 1918; Served with them as O-3 between 1920 and 1921; Dismantled by June 1921; Briefly recommissioned in 1923 as Auxiliary Vessel No. 2538

General characteristics
- Class & type: Type U 51 submarine
- Displacement: 715 t (704 long tons) surfaced; 902 t (888 long tons) submerged
- Length: 65.20 m (213 ft 11 in) (o/a); 52.51 m (172 ft 3 in) (pressure hull)
- Beam: 6.44 m (21 ft 2 in) (oa); 4.18 m (13 ft 9 in) (pressure hull)
- Height: 7.82 m (25 ft 8 in)
- Draught: 3.64 m (11 ft 11 in)
- Installed power: 2 × 2,400 PS (1,765 kW; 2,367 shp) surfaced; 2 × 1,200 PS (883 kW; 1,184 shp) submerged
- Propulsion: 2 shafts
- Speed: 17.1 knots (31.7 km/h; 19.7 mph) surfaced; 9.1 knots (16.9 km/h; 10.5 mph) submerged
- Range: 9,400 nmi (17,400 km; 10,800 mi) at 8 knots (15 km/h; 9.2 mph) surfaced; 55 nmi (102 km; 63 mi) at 5 knots (9.3 km/h; 5.8 mph) submerged
- Test depth: 50 m (164 ft 1 in)
- Complement: 36
- Armament: 4 × 50 cm (19.7 in) torpedo tubes (two bow, two stern); 7 torpedoes; 2 × 8.8 cm (3.5 in) SK L/30 deck guns

Service record
- Part of: Imperial German Navy: II Flotilla; 29 July 1916 – 11 November 1918
- Commanders: Kptlt. Wilhelm Werner; 9 June 1916 – 9 August 1918; Kptlt. Alexander Weiß; 10 August – 14 September 1918; Oblt.z.S. Hans Friedrich; 15 September – 11 November 1918
- Operations: 14 patrols
- Victories: 61 merchant ships sunk (126,010 GRT); 3 auxiliary warship sunk (7,732 GRT); 7 merchant ships damaged (26,161 GRT); 2 merchant ships taken as prize (3,466 GRT)

SM U-55 was one of the six Type U-51 U-boats of the Imperial German Navy during the First World War.

== Construction and commissioning ==
U-55 was ordered from Germaniawerft, Kiel on 23 August 1914, was laid down on 28 December 1914 and launched on 18 March 1916. She was commissioned under her first commander Wilhelm Werner on 8 June 1916.

== In German service ==
Werner commanded her for most of her wartime career, during which she undertook 14 patrols with II Flotilla, sinking 61 merchant ships for a total of 126,010 GRT. She also damaged another seven for a total of 26,161 gross register tons (GRT), and took another two as prizes for a total of 3,466 GRT. Her most famous act was the sinking of the British passenger liner RMS Carpathia with three torpedoes, on 17 July 1918, off the east coast of Ireland. Carpathia herself had become famous for her actions in coming to the rescue of the sinking RMS Titanic in 1912. U-55 also sank the hospital ship HMHS Rewa on 4 January 1918.

Werner was replaced by Alexander Weiss on 10 August 1918, Weiss being succeeded by Hans Friedrich on 15 September and commanding U-55 until the armistice on 11 November 1918.

== In Japanese service ==
On 26 November 1918 U-55 was surrendered to the Royal Navy at Harwich, along with the rest of the surviving U-Boat fleet. It was subsequently handed over to Japan, and entered service with the Imperial Japanese Navy in 1920 as O-3, serving as such until 1921. It was dismantled at the Sasebo Navy Yard between March and June 1921, briefly recommissioning in 1923 as Auxiliary Vessel No. 2538.

== Summary of raiding history ==
Date	Name	Nationality	Tonnage (Note: Merchant ship tonnages are in gross register tons. Military vessels are listed by tons displacement.)	Fate
28 September 1916	HMT Orsino	Royal Navy	172	Sunk
30 September 1916	Atle	Sweden	1,725	Captured as prize
30 September 1916	Talavera	Sweden	1,741	Captured as prize
24 October 1916	Clearfield	United Kingdom	4,229	Sunk
28 October 1916	Marina	United Kingdom	5,204	Sunk
22 January 1917	Ethel	United Kingdom	23	Sunk
23 January 1917	Eden	Russia	142	Sunk
23 January 1917	Salland	Netherlands	3,657	Sunk
27 January 1917	Artist	United Kingdom	3,570	Sunk
30 January 1917	Euonymus	United Kingdom	60	Sunk
30 January 1917	Helena And Samuel	United Kingdom	59	Sunk
30 January 1917	Marcelle	Belgium	219	Sunk
30 January 1917	Merit	United Kingdom	39	Sunk
30 January 1917	Trevone	United Kingdom	46	Sunk
30 January 1917	W.A.H.	United Kingdom	47	Sunk
30 January 1917	Wetherill	United Kingdom	46	Sunk
31 January 1917	Dundee	Canada	2,290	Sunk
31 January 1917	Saint Leon	France	230	Sunk
31 January 1917	Yvonne	France	87	Sunk
1 February 1917	Ada	United Kingdom	24	Sunk
1 February 1917	Essonite	United Kingdom	589	Sunk
1 February 1917	Inverlyon	United Kingdom	59	Sunk
2 February 1917	Pomoschnick	Russia	167	Sunk
6 February 1917	Saxon Briton	United Kingdom	1,337	Sunk
7 February 1917	Yola	United Kingdom	3,504	Sunk
4 April 1917	H. B. Linnemann	Denmark	444	Damaged
5 April 1917	Vilja	Norway	1,049	Sunk
6 April 1917	Vine Branch	United Kingdom	3,442	Sunk
8 April 1917	Petridge	United Kingdom	1,712	Sunk
8 April 1917	Torrington	United Kingdom	5,597	Sunk
8 April 1917	Umvoti	United Kingdom	2,616	Sunk
12 April 1917	Toro	United Kingdom	3,066	Sunk
15 April 1917	Astræa	Denmark	260	Sunk
17 April 1917	Cairnhill	United Kingdom	4,981	Sunk
8 June 1917	Russian Prince	United Kingdom	4,158	Damaged
9 June 1917	Achilles	United Kingdom	641	Sunk
11 June 1917	Ausonia	United Kingdom	8,153	Damaged
12 June 1917	Coronado	United Kingdom	6,539	Damaged
23 June 1917	Sophie	Denmark	89	Sunk
23 June 1917	Star	Denmark	120	Sunk
31 July 1917	Belgian Prince	United Kingdom	4,765	Sunk
6 August 1917	Eugenia	Italy	4,835	Sunk
9 August 1917	Oakfield	United Kingdom	3,618	Damaged
12 August 1917	Falkland	Norway	4,877	Sunk
17 August 1917	Edina	United Kingdom	455	Sunk
18 August 1917	HMT Benjamin Stevenson	Royal Navy	255	Sunk
4 January 1918	HMHS Rewa	Royal Navy	7,305	Sunk
5 January 1918	War Baron	United Kingdom	6,240	Sunk
9 January 1918	Ula	Norway	839	Sunk
16 January 1918	Genevieve	France	1,598	Sunk
20 January 1918	Hirondelle	France	28	Sunk
21 January 1918	Maria Caterina	Netherlands	71	Sunk
26 February 1918	Eumaeus	United Kingdom	6,696	Sunk
26 February 1918	Mouche	France	65	Sunk
1 March 1918	Borga	United Kingdom	1,046	Sunk
7 March 1918	Brise	France	160	Sunk
7 March 1918	Saint Georges	France	102	Sunk
7 March 1918	Saint Joseph	France	434	Sunk
8 March 1918	Madeline	United Kingdom	2,890	Sunk
10 March 1918	Cristina	Spain	2,083	Sunk
15 May 1918	War Grange	United Kingdom	3,100	Damaged
16 May 1918	Tagona	Canada	2,004	Sunk
17 May 1918	Motricine	France	4,047	Sunk
18 May 1918	Denbigh Hall	United Kingdom	4,943	Sunk
18 May 1918	Scholar	United Kingdom	1,635	Sunk
16 July 1918	Miefield	Norway	1,368	Sunk
17 July 1918	Carpathia	United Kingdom	13,603	Sunk
23 July 1918	Anna Sofie	United Kingdom	2,577	Sunk
31 July 1918	Zwaantje Cornelia	Netherlands	149	Damaged
1 October 1918	Montfort	United Kingdom	6,578	Sunk
2 October 1918	Keltier	Belgium	2,360	Sunk
4 October 1918	Uranus	Russia	350	Sunk
10 October 1918	Andre	France	160	Sunk

== Original documents from Room 40 ==
The following is a verbatim transcription of the recorded activities of SM U-55 known to British Naval Intelligence, Room 40 O.B.:

"SM U-55.

Kptlt. Wilhelm Werner. Was completed at Kiel about the beginning of June 1916, did trials at the Kiel School until about 28th July 1916 and then entered the North Sea, joining the 2nd Half Flotilla.

- 30th July – 4th August 1916. ? Trial cruises in North Sea.
- 19th August – 21st August 1916. Bight patrol.
- 20th September – 1st October 1916. To west of Orkney Islands. Sank 1 armed trawler. Took 2 prizes.
- 14th October – 9th November 1916. Northabout to S.W. of Ireland. Sank ? 3 S.S.
- 20th January – 11th February 1917. Atlantic via Channel. Claims 7 S.S., 13 sailing vessels (23,000 tons).
- 4th March – 9th March 1917. To the west through the Channel. Returned damaged through touching ground in fog.
- 30th March - ? 23rd April 1917. To S.W. of Ireland and Channel approaches, uncertain whether northabout or through the Channel. Back northabout. Claims sinkings 7 S.S., 2 sailing vessels (24,300 tons.) Prisoners, 5 English captains, 3 gunners. Booty, 1 gun. Amongst ships sunk was S.S. TORRINGTON (8th April). Crew was taken on board submarine. Master sent below. Submarine then dived leaving crew to drown.
- 31st May – 26th June 1917. To S.W. of Ireland, northabout both ways. Sank 3 S.S., 1 sailing vessel.
- 26th July – 21st August 1917. To S.W. of Ireland, possibly passing S.W. of Faroes on the way home. Claims 5 S.S. (19,200 tons).
- 26th September – 23rd October 1917. Apparently patrolling S. of Faroes. At Klaksvig (Faroes) October 17th/18th. Returned by Sound.
- 29th December 1917 – 23rd January 1918. To south of Ireland, Channel both ways. Possibly attacked by H.M. submarine E51 in 54°47'N., 6°18'E. Sank British hospital ship REWA by torpedo in 50°48'N., 4°48'W. Claims 5 S.S., 2 sailing vessels (18,000 tons).
- 18th February – 17th March 1918. Through Channel to western approaches. Back northabout. Hit by torpedo, which did not explode hospital ship GUILDFORD CASTLE. Was chased and fired at by H.M. submarine K7 on March 15th. Returned with machinery out of order. Claims 8 ships (14,000 tons).
- 8th May – 30th May 1918. To Channel approaches. Route - Bight, Fair Island both ways, Sound. She may have been depth-charged on 18th, 20th, 21st May, and attacked by H.M. submarine E38 on 25th May in 57°52'N., 8°13'W. Sank 5 S.S. (25,000 tons). ? 8th July - ? 2nd August 1918. Northabout to S.W. of Ireland. Back northabout and Little Belt. Sank S.S. CARPATHIA, 1 S.S., 1 sailing vessel.
- 1st September – 19th October 1918. Atlantic, northabout both ways. Possibly sank 3 S.S., 2 sailing vessels. (Claims 2 S.S., 2 sailing vessels plus 8,900 tons). Attacked by U.S.S. SAVAGE on October 1st in 48°5'N., 10°5'W. Returned owing to damage to deck.
- 27th November 1918. Surrendered at Harwich."

Note: S.S. = Steam Ship; S.V. = Sailing Vessel; northabout, Muckle Flugga, Fair I. = around Scotland; Sound, Belts, Kattegat = via North of Denmark to/from German Baltic ports; Bight = to/from German North Sea ports; success = sinking of ships

— Koerver, Hans Joachim (2009). Room 40: German Naval Warfare 1914-1918. Vol II., The Fleet in Being. Steinbach: LIS Reinisch. ISBN 978-3-902433-77-0.

== See also ==
- Room 40

== Bibliography ==
- Gröner, Erich; Jung, Dieter; Maass, Martin (1991). U-boats and Mine Warfare Vessels. German Warships 1815–1945. Vol. 2. Translated by Thomas, Keith; Magowan, Rachel. London: Conway Maritime Press. ISBN 0-85177-593-4.
- Spindler, Arno (1966) [1932]. Der Handelskrieg mit U-Booten. 5 Vols. Berlin: Mittler & Sohn. Vols. 4+5, dealing with 1917+18, are very hard to find: Guildhall Library, London, has them all, also Vol. 1–3 in an English translation: The submarine war against commerce.
- Beesly, Patrick (1982). Room 40: British Naval Intelligence 1914–1918. London: H Hamilton. ISBN 978-0-241-10864-2.
- Halpern, Paul G. (1995). A Naval History of World War I. New York: Routledge. ISBN 978-1-85728-498-0.
- Roessler, Eberhard (1997). Die Unterseeboote der Kaiserlichen Marine. Bonn: Bernard & Graefe. ISBN 978-3-7637-5963-7.
- Schroeder, Joachim (2002). Die U-Boote des Kaisers. Bonn: Bernard & Graefe. ISBN 978-3-7637-6235-4.
- Koerver, Hans Joachim (2008). Room 40: German Naval Warfare 1914–1918. Vol I., The Fleet in Action. Steinbach: LIS Reinisch. ISBN 978-3-902433-76-3.
- Koerver, Hans Joachim (2009). Room 40: German Naval Warfare 1914–1918. Vol II., The Fleet in Being. Steinbach: LIS Reinisch. ISBN 978-3-902433-77-0.
