= Directorate for Enemy Property (Norway) =

Former Norwegian governmental agency

The Directorate for Enemy Property (Norwegian: Direktoratet for fiendtlig eiendom) was a Norwegian government agency responsible for nationalization of all enemy property in Norway following the end of World War II. The organization was established on 8 March 1945 and disestablished on 31 December 1956. It had its head office in Oslo and was subordinate to the Ministry of Trade and Industry.
