= HMHS Rewa =

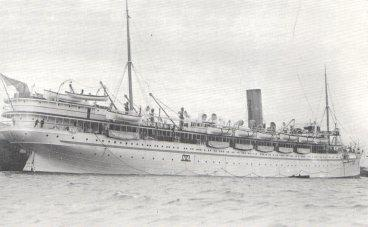
- Rewa before her wartime service

History

United Kingdom
- Name: Rewa
- Operator: British-India Steam Navigation Company
- Builder: William Denny & Brothers, Dumbarton
- Yard number: 762
- Launched: 14 February 1906
- Completed: 7 June 1906
- Fate: Torpedoed on 4 January 1918

General characteristics
- Tonnage: 7,308 tons
- Length: 456 ft (139 m)
- Beam: 56.2 ft (17.1 m)
- Draught: 30 ft (9.1 m)
- Installed power: 9,344 shp (6,968 kW)
- Propulsion: 1 × single-stage Parsons steam turbine; 3 × shafts
- Speed: 18 knots (33 km/h; 21 mph)

HMHS Rewa (Note: HMHS is a ship prefix which stands for His Majesty's Hospital Ship) was a steamship originally built for the British-India Steam Navigation Company for their mail and passenger service but requisitioned in August 1914 and fitted out for use as a British hospital ship during the First World War. On 4 January 1918, she was hit and sunk by a torpedo from the German U-boat U-55.

== History ==
Rewa was ordered in 1905 by the British India Steam Navigation Company (BI) from William Denny & Bros at Dumbarton at the same time as sister ship Rohilla from Harland & Wolff of Belfast. They differed mainly in their engines: Rewa mounted triple screws with steam turbines, while Rohilla had a pair of quadruple expansion steam engines, also made by Harland & Wolff, and twin screws. Rohilla's engines totalled 8,000 indicated horsepower (6,000 kW), producing 16.6 knots (30.7 km/h; 19.1 mph) on sea trials. Although ordered for the London to Calcutta service, increased competition prompted BI to design the two sisters to be suitable also as troopships.

== Career ==
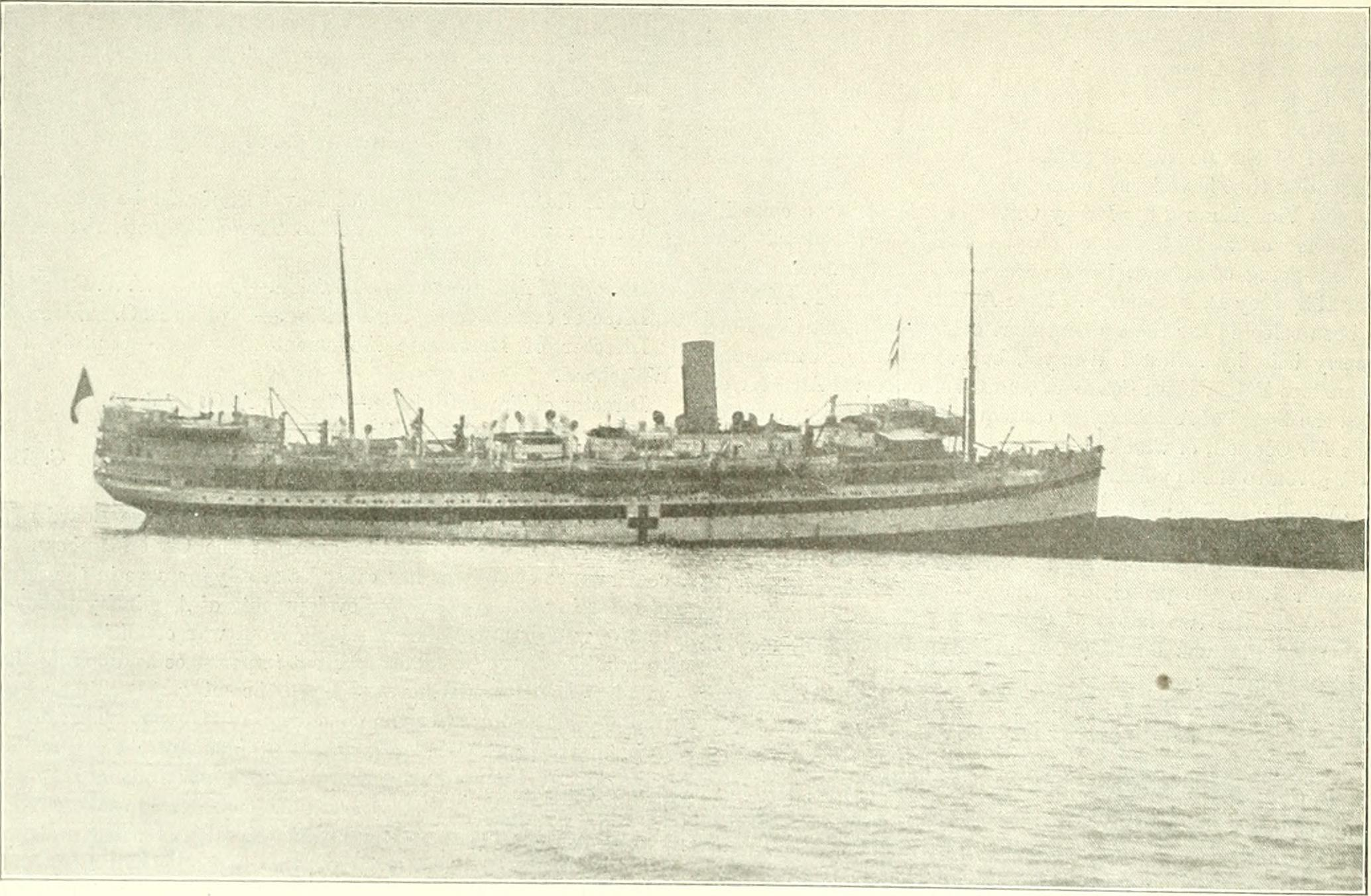
Rewa as a hospital ship. Rewa was run aground at the Suez Canal in November 1906, and was refloated

The British India Company's transport Rewa was run aground at the Suez Canal on 26 November 1906, blocking the canal, and was refloated by the next day. In 1913 she entered the Suez Canal from Karachi carrying the 2nd Battalion, Worcestershire Regiment homeward bound to England.

== Sinking ==
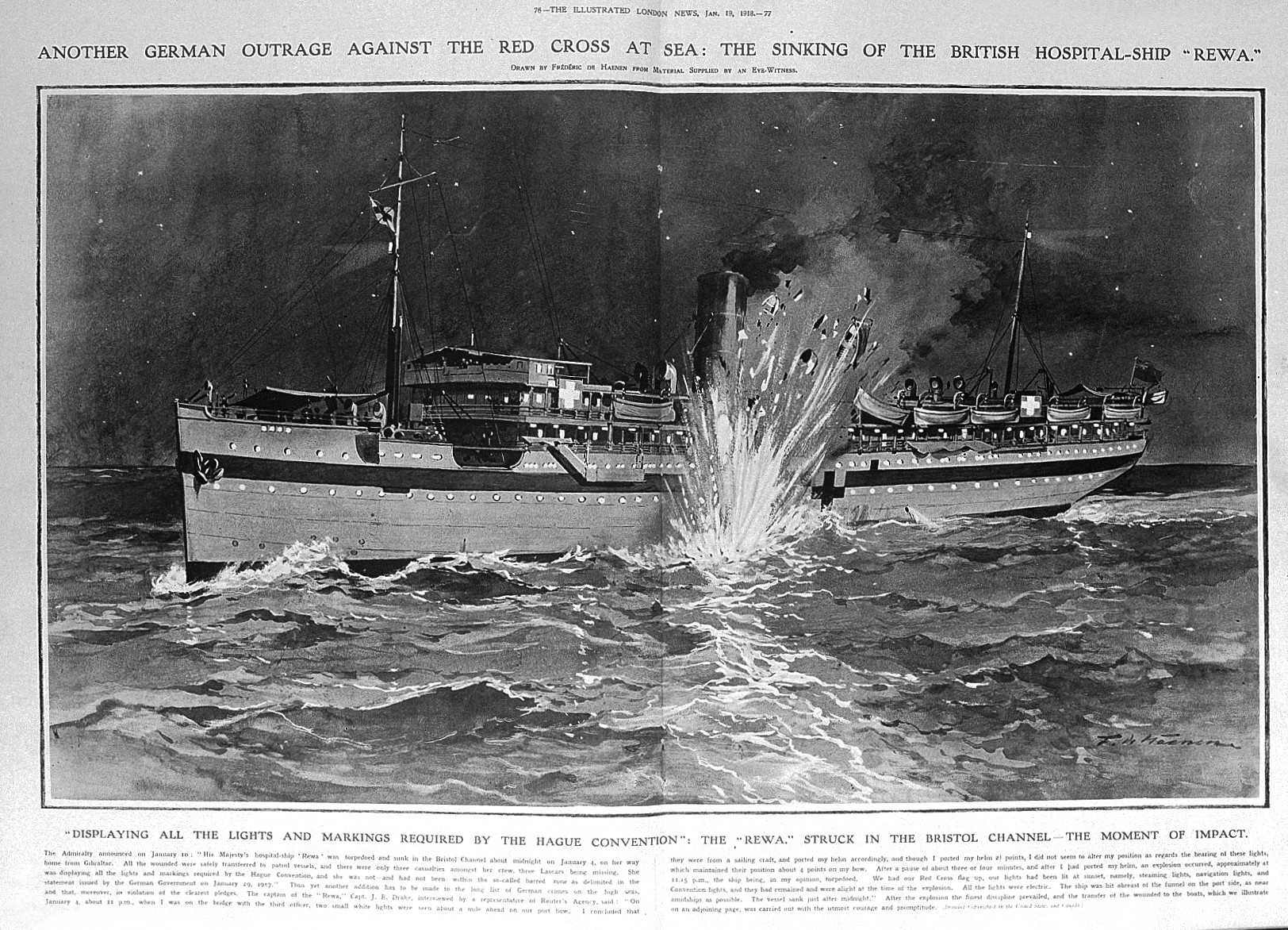
A depiction of the sinking of the British hospital ship Rewa from The Illustrated London News

On 4 January 1918, Rewa was returning to Britain from Malta with 279 wounded officers aboard. Neutral inspectors from Spain had boarded the ship at Gibraltar to confirm that she had no military function. At 11:15, she was hit by a torpedo 19 miles (31 km) off Hartland Point. The ship took around two hours to sink, allowing all wounded and ship's crew to board lifeboats except for the four engine men who died in the initial explosion.

== Aftermath ==
The sinking of the ship caused outrage in Britain. The German high command denied sinking the ship, instead blaming the explosion on a loose British mine. However, German naval command had declared unrestricted submarine warfare in a desperate effort to win the war. The naval command secretly ordered U-boat captains to sink any Allied ship, including hospital ships, even though it violated Hague Convention X. However, the captain of U-55 Wilhelm Werner—perhaps fearing the consequences of his actions—wrote in the ship's log that he sank a cargo vessel and not a brightly lit and painted hospital ship. After the war, Werner was charged with war crimes but fled to Brazil. In 2002, a stone was erected near Hartland Point dedicated to the ship and the people who served and died on her. The four engine men who died are commemorated on the Bombay 1914-1918 Memorial in Mumbai.

== Wreckage ==
The wreckage lies at 50°55′N 4°49′W, which is located off the west coast of the United Kingdom. It lies in about 200 ft (61 m) of water which makes it difficult for all but the most experienced divers to explore. During the Second World War, the wreckage was often mistaken by British sonar for a German U-boat. To confirm that a U-boat was not just hiding on the sea bed, Allied ships would drop depth charges, called opening the "tin can". If oil or German bodies floated to the surface then they knew they had destroyed a U-boat. If nothing floated up then they would move to the next sonar target. This process totally destroyed the wreck of Rewa.

== See also ==
- List of United Kingdom disasters by death toll
