= HMS Recruit =

Seven ships of the Royal Navy have borne the name HMS Recruit:

- HMS Recruit (1806) was an 18-gun Cruizer-class brig-sloop launched in 1806 and sold in 1822.
- HMS Recruit (1829) was a 10-gun Cherokee-class brig-sloop launched in 1829. She foundered in 1832.
- HMS Recruit (1846) was a 12-gun iron brig launched in 1846 and sold in 1849. She was then converted to a screw ship and was resold into civilian service under the name Harbinger.
- HMS Recruit (1855) was an iron paddle gunboat, launched in 1850 and previously the Prussian ship Salamander. She was exchanged in 1855 together with the Prussian Nix for the fifth rate HMS Thetis. Recruit was sold in 1869.
- HMS Recruit (1896) was a Brazen-class destroyer launched in 1896 and sunk by German U-boat SM UB-6 in 1915.
- HMS Recruit (1916) was an R-class destroyer launched in 1916 and sunk by U-boat SM UB-16 in 1917.
- HMS Recruit (J298) was an Algerine-class minesweeper launched in 1943 and broken up in 1965.
