= List of shipwrecks in June 1915 =

The list of shipwrecks in June 1915 includes ships sunk, foundered, grounded, or otherwise lost during June 1915.

== 1 June ==
List of shipwrecks: 1 June 1915
| Ship | State | Description |
|---|---|---|
| HMS Mohawk | Royal Navy | World War I: The Tribal-class destroyer struck a mine and was damaged in the English Channel with the loss of five of her crew. |
| Saidieh | United Kingdom | World War I: The cargo ship was torpedoed and sunk in the Thames Estuary by SM UB-6 (Imperial German Navy) with the loss of eight of her 54 crew. |
| Steers #17 | United States | The scow sank at Short Beach, Connecticut. |
| Victoria | United Kingdom | World War I: The 104.7-foot (31.9 m), 155-ton steam trawler was shelled and captured in the Atlantic Ocean off the Isles of Scilly by SM U-34 (Imperial German Navy) with the loss of her skipper and 4 crew, and a boy passenger also killed. Survivors taken abord the U-boat. Scuttled with explosives the next day (50°36′N 6°20′W). Survivors of Victoria and "Hirose" put in a boat. Survivors picked up on 3 June by "Ballater" (United Kingdom) |

== 2 June ==
List of shipwrecks: 2 June 1915
| Ship | State | Description |
|---|---|---|
| Cubano | Norway | World War I: The cargo ship was shelled and sunk in the Atlantic Ocean 15 nautical miles (28 km) north east of the Flannan Isles, Outer Hebrides, United Kingdom (58°25′N 7°40′W) by SM U-35 (Imperial German Navy). Her crew survived. |
| Cyrus | Denmark | World War I: The cargo ship was sunk in the North Sea (56°45′N 2°00′E) by SM U-14 (Imperial German Navy). Her crew survived. |
| Delta B | Belgium | World War I: The fishing vessel was shelled and sunk, or sunk with explosives, in the Atlantic Ocean 12 nautical miles (22 km) south south west of the Isles of Scilly, United Kingdom (49°40′N 6°30′W) by SM U-34 (Imperial German Navy). Her crew was rescued by HMT Dewsland (Royal Navy). |
| Hirose | United Kingdom | World War I: The trawler was shelled and captured and then scuttled by shelling and explosives placed on board in the Atlantic Ocean 32 nautical miles (59 km) west of the Isles of Scilly (49°50′N 7°10′W) by SM U-34 (Imperial German Navy). Survivors taken abord the U-boat. Her crew and the survivors of "Victoria" were put in a boat. Survivors picked up on 3 June by "Ballater" (United Kingdom). |
| Marmaris | Ottoman Navy | World War I: The Marmaris-class gunboat was scuttled at Basra after being damaged by HMS Odin on the Tigris River south of Amara. |
| Salvador | Denmark | World War I: The sailing vessel was stopped and sunk in the North Sea 7 nautical miles (13 km) south west of Sumburgh Head, Aberdeenshire, United Kingdom by SM U-19 (Imperial German Navy). Her crew survived. |
| Soeborg | Denmark | World War I: The cargo ship was reported to have been torpedoed and sunk in the North Sea 65 nautical miles (120 km) off the Farne Islands, Northumberland, United Kingdom. |

== 3 June ==
List of shipwrecks: 3 June 1915
| Ship | State | Description |
|---|---|---|
| Boy Horace | United Kingdom | World War I: The fishing smack was scuttled in the North Sea 50 nautical miles (93 km) south east of Lowestoft, Suffolk by SM UB-16 (Imperial German Navy). Her crew survived. |
| Chrysoprasus | United Kingdom | World War I: The fishing vessel was shelleded and sunk in the North Sea 45 nautical miles (83 km) east north east of Papa Westray, Orkney Islands by SM U-19 (Imperial German Navy). Her crew survived. |
| Dogberry | United Kingdom | World War I: The trawler was stopped and scuttled in the North Sea 25 nautical miles (46 km) east of Fair Isle by SM U-19 (Imperial German Navy). Her crew survived. |
| E & C | United Kingdom | World War I: The fishing smack was scuttled in the North Sea 40 nautical miles (74 km) south east by east of Lowestoft (51°49′N 2°49′E) by SM UB-16 (Imperial German Navy). Her crew survived. |
| Economy | United Kingdom | World War I: The fishing smack was scuttled in the North Sea 50 nautical miles (93 km) south east of Lowestoft by SM UB-16 (Imperial German Navy). Her crew survived. |
| Ena May | United Kingdom | World War I: The trawler was shelled and sunk in the North Sea 66 nautical miles (122 km) south west by south of Sumburgh Head, Aberdeenshire by SM U-19 (Imperial German Navy). Her crew survived. |
| Iona | United Kingdom | World War I: The cargo ship was torpedoed and sunk in the North Sea 22 nautical miles (41 km) south east of Fair Isle (59°13′N 1°12′W) by SM U-19 (Imperial German Navy). Her crew survived. |
| Kathleen | United Kingdom | World War I: The 86.3-foot (26.3 m), 92-ton steam drifter was captured and scuttled in the North Sea 40 nautical miles (74 km) east south east of Papa Stronsay Orkney Islands by SM U-19 (Imperial German Navy). Her crew survived. |
| Lappland | Sweden | World War I: The cargo ship was torpedoed and sunk in the North Sea at (57°13′N 0°20′W) en route from Narvik to Middlesbrough by SM U-14 (Imperial German Navy). Her crew survived. |
| Penfeld | France | World War I: The coaster was sunk in the Bay of Biscay 50 nautical miles (93 km) north west of Ouessant, Finistère by SM U-34 (Imperial German Navy). Her crew survived. |
| Strathbran | United Kingdom | World War I: The trawler was shelled and sunk in the North Sea 35 nautical miles (65 km) east south east of the Pentland Skerries by SM U-19 (Imperial German Navy). Her crew survived. |
| Virginia | Greece | World War I: The cargo ship struck a mine and sank in the Adriatic Sea off Trieste, Friuli-Venezia Giulia, Italy. |

== 4 June ==
List of shipwrecks: 4 June 1915
| Ship | State | Description |
|---|---|---|
| Casabianca | French Navy | World War I: The D'Iberville class aviso was sunk by the explosion of one of her mines in the Gulf of Smyrna. There were 86 killed and 66 survivors. |
| Cortes | United Kingdom | World War I: The trawler was scuttled in the North Sea 68 nautical miles (126 km) east north east of Wick, Caithness by SM U-19 (Imperial German Navy). Her crew survived. |
| Dunnet Head | United Kingdom | World War I: The coaster was torpedoed and sunk in the North Sea 35 nautical miles (65 km) east by south of Dunnet Head, Caithness (58°42′N 1°55′W) by SM U-19 (Imperial German Navy). Her crew survived. |
| Ebenezer | United Kingdom | World War I: The trawler was sunk in the North Sea 117 nautical miles (217 km) south south west of the Out Skerries, Shetland Islands (58°31′N 1°21′W) by SM U-19 (Imperial German Navy). Her crew picked up by drifter "Floreat" (United Kingdom) the next day. |
| Evening Star | United Kingdom | World War I: The trawler was shelled and sunk in the North Sea 68 nautical miles (126 km) east north east of Wick by SM U-19 (Imperial German Navy). Her crew survived. |
| Explorer | United Kingdom | World War I: The trawler was shelled and sunk in the North Sea 73 nautical miles (135 km) north east by north of Buchan Ness, Aberdeenshire by SM U-19 (Imperial German Navy). Her crew survived. |
| George & Mary | United Kingdom | World War I: The schooner was shelled and sunk in the Atlantic Ocean 15 nautical miles (28 km) south west of Eagle Island, County Mayo by SM U-35 (Imperial German Navy). Her crew survived. |
| Inkum | United Kingdom | World War I: The cargo ship was torpedoed and sunk in the Atlantic Ocean 40 nautical miles (74 km) south west of The Lizard, Cornwall (49°25′N 6°35′W) by SM U-34 (Imperial German Navy). Her crew survived. |
| Petrel | United Kingdom | World War I: The trawler was shelled and sunk in the North Sea 55 nautical miles (102 km) north east of Buchan Ness by SM U-19 (Imperial German Navy). Her crew survived. |
| Yenisei | Imperial Russian Navy | World War I: The Amur-class minelayer was sunk in the Baltic Sea (59°10′N 23°43′E) by the submarine SM U-26 (Imperial German Navy). Her crew survived. |

== 5 June ==
List of shipwrecks: 5 June 1915
| Ship | State | Description |
|---|---|---|
| Adolf | Russia | World War I: The schooner was sunk in the North Sea 30 nautical miles (56 km) off Rattray Head, Aberdeenshire, United Kingdom by SM U-19 (Imperial German Navy) with the loss of two of her six crew. |
| Bardolph | United Kingdom | World War I: The trawler was shelled and sunk in the North Sea 115 nautical miles (213 km) south by west of Sumburgh Head, Shetland Islands by SM U-19 (Imperial German Navy). Her crew survived. |
| Curlew | United Kingdom | World War I: The trawler was shelled and sunk in the North Sea 40 nautical miles (74 km) east of Peterhead, Aberdeenshire by SM U-19 (Imperial German Navy). Her crew survived. |
| Fantassin | French Navy | The Chasseur-class destroyer was rammed and damaged in the Ionian Sea by Mameluck (French Navy). She was consequently scuttled by Fauconneau (French Navy). |
| Gazehound | United Kingdom | World War I: The trawler was shelled and sunk in the North Sea 40 nautical miles (74 km) east of Peterhead by SM U-19 (Imperial German Navy). Her crew survived. |
| Japonica | United Kingdom | World War I: The trawler was shelled and sunk in the North Sea 45 nautical miles (83 km) east of Kinnaird Head, Aberdeenshire by SM U-19 (Imperial German Navy). Her crew survived. |
| Persimon | United Kingdom | World War I: The trawler was shelled and sunk in the North Sea 50 nautical miles (93 km) east north east of Peterhead by SM U-19 (Imperial German Navy). Her crew survived. |
| SM U-14 | Imperial German Navy | World War I: The Type U 13 submarine was shelled and sunk in the North Sea off Peterhead, United Kingdom by HMT Oceanic II (Royal Navy) with the loss of one of her 28 crew. |

== 6 June ==
List of shipwrecks: 6 June 1915
| Ship | State | Description |
|---|---|---|
| Arctic | United Kingdom | World War I: The trawler was shelled and sunk in the North Sea 77 nautical miles (143 km) south east by south of Spurn Head, Yorkshire by SM U-19 (Imperial German Navy) with the loss of four of her nine crew. Survivors were rescued by the trawler Jurassic (United Kingdom). |
| Dromio | United Kingdom | World War I: The trawler was scuttled in the North Sea 35 nautical miles (65 km) north east by east of Buchan Ness, Aberdeenshire by SM U-19 (Imperial German Navy). Her crew survived. |
| HMS Immingham | Royal Navy | The stores carrier was sunk in the Mediterranean Sea in a collision with the boom defence vessel HMS Reindeer (Royal Navy). |
| Star of the West | United Kingdom | World War I: The trawler was shelled and sunk in the North Sea off Peterhead, Aberdeenshire by a German submarine. Her crew were rescued by the trawler Shamrock (United Kingdom). |
| Sunlight | United Kingdom | World War I: The barque was torpedoed and sunk in the Atlantic Ocean 20 nautical miles (37 km) south west of Galley Head, County Cork by SM U-35 (Imperial German Navy). Her crew survived; they were rescued by the trawler Indian Empire. |

== 7 June ==
List of shipwrecks: 7 June 1915
| Ship | State | Description |
|---|---|---|
| Ceyhun | Ottoman Empire | World War I: The cargo ship was torpedoed and sunk in the Sea of Marmara off Nagara Point, Turkey by HMS E11 (Royal Navy). |
| Glittertind | Norway | World War I: The coaster was sunk in the North Sea 28 nautical miles (52 km) off Whitby, Yorkshire, United Kingdom (54°55′N 0°10′E) by SM U-25 (Imperial German Navy). Her crew survived. |
| Menapier | Belgium | World War I: The cargo ship was torpedoed and sunk in the North Sea 2 nmi (3.7 km) off the Tongue Lightship (United Kingdom) (51°28′05″N 1°35′15″E) by SM UB-10 (Imperial German Navy) with the loss of seventeen crew. |
| Nottingham | United Kingdom | World War I: The trawler was shelled and sunk in the North Sea 70 nautical miles (130 km) north east of Spurn Point, Yorkshire by SM U-25 (Imperial German Navy). Her crew were rescued by the trawler Onward (United Kingdom). |
| Pentland | United Kingdom | World War I: The trawler was shelled and sunk in the North Sea 75 nautical miles (139 km) east north east of Hornsea, Yorkshire by SM U-25 (Imperial German Navy). Her crew survived. |
| Saturn | United Kingdom | World War I: The trawler was shelled and sunk in the North Sea 86 nautical miles (159 km) north east of Spurn Point by SM U-25 (Imperial German Navy). Her crew survived. |
| Superb | Norway | World War I: The barque was sunk in the Atlantic Ocean 50 nautical miles (93 km) west of the Fastnet Rock (51°15′N 10°45′W) by SM U-34 (Imperial German Navy). Her crew survived. |
| Trudvang | Norway | World War I: The cargo ship was sunk in the Atlantic Ocean 64 nautical miles (119 km) south west by west of the smalls Lighthouse (51°08′N 6°45′W) by SM U-35 (Imperial German Navy). Her crew survived. |
| Velocity | United Kingdom | World War I: The trawler was sunk in the North Sea 75 nautical miles (139 km) north east of Spurn Point by SM U-25 (Imperial German Navy). Her crew survived. |

== 8 June ==
List of shipwrecks: 8 June 1915
| Ship | State | Description |
|---|---|---|
| A. W. Perry | Canada | The cargo liner ran aground at Chebucto Head, Nova Scotia. All 175 people on board were rescued but the ship was declared a total loss. She was on a voyage from Boston, Massachusetts to Halifax, Nova Scotia. |
| Express | United Kingdom | World War I: The schooner was scuttled in the Atlantic Ocean 44 nautical miles (81 km)south west of the Smalls Lighthouse by SM U-35 (Imperial German Navy). Her crew survived. |
| La Liberté | France | World War I: The schooner was sunk in the Atlantic Ocean 60 nautical miles (110 km) west of Lundy Island, Devon, United Kingdom by SM U-35 (Imperial German Navy). Her crew survived. |
| Strathcarron | United Kingdom | World War I: The collier was torpedoed and sunk in the Atlantic Ocean 60 nautical miles (110 km) west of Lundy Island (51°50′N 6°10′W) by SM U-35 (Imperial German Navy). Her crew survived. |
| Susannah | United Kingdom | World War I: The schooner was scuttled in the Atlantic Ocean 40 nautical miles (74 km) south south west of the Smalls Lighthouse (50°55′N 5°35′W) by SM U-35 (Imperial German Navy). Her crew survived. |

== 9 June ==
List of shipwrecks: 9 June 1915
| Ship | State | Description |
|---|---|---|
| Britannia | United Kingdom | World War I: The fishing smack was scuttled in the North Sea 50 nautical miles (93 km) of Lowestoft, Suffolk by SM UB-2 (Imperial German Navy). Her crew survived. |
| Cardiff | United Kingdom | World War I: The trawler was shelled and sunk in the North Sea 90 nautical miles (170 km) north east by east of Spurn Point, Yorkshire by SM U-25 (Imperial German Navy). Her crew were rescued by the trawler Vulture (United Kingdom). |
| Castor | United Kingdom | World War I: The trawler was shelled and sunk in the North Sea 80 nautical miles (150 km) north east by north of Spurn Point by SM U-25 (Imperial German Navy). Her crew survived. |
| HMS Dublin | Royal Navy | World War I: The Town-class cruiser was torpedoed and damaged in the Adriatic Sea off Cape Pali, Albania by SM U-4 (Austro-Hungarian Navy) with the loss of twelve of her 440 crew. HMS Dublin was subsequently repaired and returned to service. |
| Edward | United Kingdom | World War I: The fishing smack was scuttled in the North Sea 48 nautical miles (89 km) east by south of Lowestoft by SM UB-2 (Imperial German Navy). Her crew survived. |
| Erna Boldt | United Kingdom | World War I: The cargo ship struck a mine and sank in the Thames Estuary 0.5 nautical miles (930 m) north east by east of the Sunk Lightship (United Kingdom). Her crew survived. |
| J. Leyman | United Kingdom | World War I: The trawler was shelled and sunk in the North Sea 100 nautical miles (190 km) east by north of Spurn Point by SM U-25 (Imperial German Navy). Her crew survived. |
| Lady Salisbury | United Kingdom | World War I: The cargo ship struck a mine and sank in the Thames Estuary 1 nautical mile (1.9 km) north of the Sunk Lightship (United Kingdom) with the loss of three of her crew. |
| Laurestina | United Kingdom | World War I: The fishing smack was scuttled in the North Sea 30 nautical miles (56 km) south east of Lowestoft by SM UB-2 (Imperial German Navy). Her crew survived. |
| Qui Vive | United Kingdom | World War I: The fishing smack was scuttled in the North Sea 48 nautical miles (89 km) east by south of Lowestoft by SM UB-2 (Imperial German Navy). Her crew survived. |
| HMT Schiehallion | Royal Navy | World War I: The naval trawler struck a mine and sank in the Dardanelles. |
| Svein Jarl | Norway | World War I: The cargo ship was sunk in the North Sea 75 nautical miles (139 km) south east of the Longstone Lighthouse (56°40′N 0°40′W) by SM U-19 (Imperial German Navy) with the loss of twelve crew. |
| Tunisian | United Kingdom | World War I: The trawler was shelled and sunk in the North Sea 95 nautical miles (176 km) north east by north of Spurn Point by SM U-25 (Imperial German Navy). Her crew survived. |
| Welfare | United Kingdom | World War I: The fishing smack was scuttled in the North Sea 50 nautical miles (93 km) east south east of Lowestoft by SM UB-2 (Imperial German Navy). Her crew survived. |

== 10 June ==
List of shipwrecks: 10 June 1915
| Ship | State | Description |
|---|---|---|
| Dania | Russia | World War I: The cargo ship was sunk in the Atlantic Ocean 55 nautical miles (102 km) north by west of the Butt of Lewis, Outer Hebrides, United Kingdom by SM U-33 (Imperial German Navy). |
| Intrepid | United Kingdom | World War I: The fishing smack was scuttled in the North Sea 60 nautical miles (110 km) south east of Lowestoft, Suffolk by SM UB-2 (Imperial German Navy). Her crew survived. |
| Medusa | Regia Marina | World War I: The Medusa-class submarine was torpedoed and sunk in the Adriatic Sea off Porto di Piave Vecchia, Veneto by SM UB-15 (Imperial German Navy). |
| HM Torpedo Boat 10 | Royal Navy | World War I: The torpedo boat struck a mine and sank in the North Sea with the loss of 22 of her crew. |
| HMS TB 12 | Royal Navy | World War I: The torpedo boat struck a mine and sank in the North Sea with the loss of 23 of her crew. |
| Thomasina | Russia | World War I: the full-rigged ship was sunk in the Atlantic Ocean 49 nautical miles (91 km) south south east of Roche's Point Lighthouse, County Cork, United Kingdom by SM U-35 (Imperial German Navy). |

== 11 June ==
List of shipwrecks: 11 June 1915
| Ship | State | Description |
|---|---|---|
| Arndale | United Kingdom | World War I: The cargo ship struck a mine and sank in the White Sea with the loss of three of her crew. |
| Dovey | United Kingdom | World War I: The trawler struck a mine and sank in the North Sea with the loss of nine of her crew. |
| Otago | Sweden | World War I: The cargo ship was torpedoed and sunk in the North Sea 30 nautical miles (56 km) east by north of Coquet Island, Northumberland, United Kingdom by SM U-19 (Imperial German Navy). Her crew survived. |
| Plymouth | United Kingdom | World War I: The trawler was shelled and sunk in the North Sea 67 nautical miles (124 km) north east of Spurn Head, Yorkshire by SM U-19 (Imperial German Navy). Her crew survived. |
| Waago | United Kingdom | World War I: The trawler was scuttled in the North Sea 80 nautical miles (150 km) north east by north of Spurn Point by SM U-19 (Imperial German Navy). Her crew survived. |

== 12 June ==
List of shipwrecks: 12 June 1915
| Ship | State | Description |
|---|---|---|
| Bellglade | Norway | World War I: The sailing vessel was sunk in the Irish Sea off St. Ann's Head, Pembrokeshire, United Kingdom (50°55′N 6°35′W) by SM U-35 (Imperial German Navy). Her crew survived. |
| Cocos | Denmark | World War I: The three-masted schooner was stopped and sunk in the North Sea (56°40′N 1°24′W) by SM U-17 (Imperial German Navy). Her crew survived. |
| Crown of India | United Kingdom | World War I: The four-masted barque was shelled and sunk in the Irish Sea 70 nautical miles (130 km) west south west of St. Ann's Head (50°55′N 6°35′W) by SM U-35 (Imperial German Navy). Her crew survived. |
| Desabla | United Kingdom | World War I: The tanker was torpedoed, shelled, and sunk in the North Sea 35 nautical miles (65 km; 40 mi) off Montrose, Forfarshire by SM U-17 (Imperial German Navy). Her crew survived. |
| Leuctra | United Kingdom | World War I: The cargo ship was torpedoed and sunk in the North Sea 1.5 nautical miles (2.8 km) south east by south of the Shipwash Lightship (United Kingdom) by SM UB-16 (Imperial German Navy). Her crew survived. |

== 13 June ==
List of shipwrecks: 13 June 1915
| Ship | State | Description |
|---|---|---|
| Diamant | France | World War I: The barque was sunk in the Irish Sea 50 nautical miles (93 km) west of Lundy Island, Devon, United Kingdom by SM U-35 (Imperial German Navy). |
| Hopemount | United Kingdom | World War I: The cargo ship was shelled and sunk in the Irish Sea 70 nautical miles (130 km) west by south of Lundy Island by SM U-35 (Imperial German Navy). Her crew survived. |
| Pelham | United Kingdom | World War I: The cargo ship was scuttled in the Atlantic Ocean 30 nautical miles (56 km) north west of the Isles of Scilly (50°16′N 6°55′W) by SM U-35 (Imperial German Navy). Her crew survived. |
| Queen Alexandra | United Kingdom | World War I: The trawler struck a mine and sank in the North Sea off Tod Head, Aberdeenshire. |

== 14 June ==
List of shipwrecks: 14 June 1915
| Ship | State | Description |
|---|---|---|
| Davanger | Norway | World War I: The cargo ship was shelled and sunk in the Atlantic Ocean 16 nautical miles (30 km) west north west of the Flannan Islands, Outer Hebrides, United Kingdom (58°20′N 8°10′W) by SM U-33 (Imperial German Navy). Her crew survived. |

== 15 June ==
List of shipwrecks: 15 June 1915
| Ship | State | Description |
|---|---|---|
| Argyll | United Kingdom | World War I: The trawler struck a mine and sank in the North Sea 12 nautical miles (22 km) east south east of Harwich, Essex with the loss of seven of her crew. |
| Strathnairn | United Kingdom | World War I: The cargo ship was torpedoed and sunk in the Bristol Channel 2 nautical miles (3.7 km) west of Ramsey Island, Pembrokeshire (50°16′N 6°37′W) by SM U-22 (Imperial German Navy) with the loss of 21 crew. |
| Verdandi | Sweden | World War I: The cargo ship was sunk in the North Sea at (57°47′N 8°40′E) by SMS Meteor (Imperial German Navy). No casualties. |

== 16 June ==
List of shipwrecks: 16 June 1915
| Ship | State | Description |
|---|---|---|
| Trafford | United Kingdom | World War I: The coaster was shelled and sunk in the Atlantic Ocean 30 nautical miles (56 km) west south west of the Tuskar Rock by SM U-22 (Imperial German Navy). |

== 18 June ==
List of shipwrecks: 18 June 1915
| Ship | State | Description |
|---|---|---|
| Ailsa | United Kingdom | World War I: The coaster was captured and sunk in the North Sea 12 nautical miles (22 km) south of Arbroath, Forfarshire by SM U-17 (Imperial German Navy). Her crew survived. |

== 19 June ==
List of shipwrecks: 19 June 1915
| Ship | State | Description |
|---|---|---|
| Dulcie | United Kingdom | World War I: The cargo ship was torpedoed and sunk in the North Sea 6 nautical miles (11 km) east of Aldeburgh, Suffolk by SM UB-13 (Imperial German Navy) with the loss of a crew member. |

== 20 June ==
List of shipwrecks: 20 June 1915
| Ship | State | Description |
|---|---|---|
| Anda | Norway | The barque ran aground on the Ridings Rocks, Bahamas and was wrecked. Her crew survived. |
| Nubia | United Kingdom | The cargo liner was driven ashore and wrecked near Colombo, Ceylon. |
| Premier | United Kingdom | World War I: The trawler was shelled and sunk in the Atlantic Ocean 70 nautical miles (130 km) north north east of Cape Wrath, Sutherland by SM U-22 (Imperial German Navy). Her crew survived. |

== 21 June ==
List of shipwrecks: 21 June 1915
| Ship | State | Description |
|---|---|---|
| Carisbrook | United Kingdom | World War I: The cargo ship was shelled and sunk in the North Sea 70 nautical miles (130 km) south by west of Start Point, Sanday, Orkney Islands by SM U-38 (Imperial German Navy). Her crew survived. |

== 22 June ==
List of shipwrecks: 22 June 1915
| Ship | State | Description |
|---|---|---|
| Bielefeld | Imperial German Navy | World War I: While stranded in the Heligoland Bight off Juist, Germany, the minesweeper was sunk by the submarine HMS D4 (Royal Navy). She was salvaged and returned to her pre-war civilian owner. |
| Leo Usikanpunski | Russia | World War I: The sailing vessel was sunk in the North Sea by SM U-38 (Imperial German Navy). |

== 23 June ==
List of shipwrecks: 23 June 1915
| Ship | State | Description |
|---|---|---|
| Elizabeth | United Kingdom | World War I: The drifter was shelled and sunk in the North Sea 40 nautical miles (74 km) east north east of the Out Skerries, Shetland Islands by SM U-38 (Imperial German Navy). Her crew survived. |
| Four | United Kingdom | World War I: The drifter was shelled and sunk in the North Sea 45 nautical miles (83 km) north east by east of the Out Skerries by SM U-38 (Imperial German Navy). Her crew survived. |
| Josephine | United Kingdom | World War I: The drifter was shelled and sunk in the North Sea 40 nautical miles (74 km) north east by east of the Out Skerries by SM U-38 (Imperial German Navy). Her crew survived. |
| Piscatorial | United Kingdom | World War I: The drifter was shelled and sunk in the North Sea 41 nautical miles (76 km) east north east of the Out Skerries by SM U-38 (Imperial German Navy). Her crew survived. |
| HMT Quail III | Royal Navy | The 116.4-foot (35.5 m) 162-ton minesweeping naval trawler collided with tug Bulldog (United Kingdom) and sank in the English Channel 7 nautical miles (13 km) south west of Portland Bill, Dorset. Her crew survived. |
| Research | United Kingdom | World War I: The drifter was shelled and sunk in the North Sea 42 nautical miles (78 km) north east of the Out Skerries by SM U-38 (Imperial German Navy). Her crew survived. |
| Truma | Norway | World War I: The cargo ship was sunk in the North Sea south of the Shetland Islands, United Kingdom (59°54′N 0°09′E) by SM U-38 (Imperial German Navy). Her crew survived. |
| Tunisiana | United Kingdom | World War I: The cargo ship was torpedoed and damaged in the North Sea off Lowestoft, Suffolk by SM UB-16 (Imperial German Navy). She ran aground on the Barnard Sands and was a total loss. Her crew survived. |
| SM U-40 | Imperial German Navy | World War I: The Type U 31 submarine was torpedoed and sunk in the North Sea off Eyemouth, Berwickshire, United Kingdom by HMS C24 (Royal Navy) with the loss of 38 of her 41 crew. |
| Uffa | United Kingdom | World War I: The drifter was shelled and sunk in the North Sea 40 nautical miles (74 km) east north east of the Out Skerries by SM U-38 (Imperial German Navy). Her crew survived. |
| Ugiebrae | United Kingdom | World War I: The drifter was shelled and sunk in the North Sea 35 nautical miles (65 km) east north east of the Out Skerries by SM U-38 (Imperial German Navy). Her crew survived. |

== 24 June ==
List of shipwrecks: 24 June 1915
| Ship | State | Description |
|---|---|---|
| Commander | United Kingdom | World War I: The trawler was shelled and sunk in the North Sea 40 nautical miles (74 km) east north east of the Out Skerries, Shetland Islands by SM U-38 (Imperial German Navy). Her crew survived. |
| Drumloist | United Kingdom | World War I: The cargo ship struck a mine and sank in the White Sea. |
| J. M. & S. | United Kingdom | World War I: The drifter was shelled and sunk in the North Sea 42 nautical miles (78 km) east north east of the Out Skerries by SM U-38 (Imperial German Navy). Her crew survived. |
| Kyanite | United Kingdom | The cargo ship came ashore at Hot Point, Cornwall. All but two of the crew were taken off by the tug Victor. |
| Lebanon | United Kingdom | World War I: The trawler was shelled and sunk in the North Sea 40 nautical miles (74 km) east north east of the Out Skerries by SM U-38 (Imperial German Navy). Her crew survived. |
| Monarda | United Kingdom | World War I: The drifter was shelled and sunk in the North Sea 41 nautical miles (76 km) east north east of the Out Skerries by SM U-38 (Imperial German Navy). Her crew survived. |
| Primrose | United Kingdom | World War I: The drifter was shelled and sunk in the North Sea 40 nautical miles (74 km) north east by east of the Out Skerries by SM U-38 (Imperial German Navy). Her crew survived. |
| Quiet Waters | United Kingdom | World War I: The drifter was shelled and sunk in the North Sea 25 nautical miles (46 km) east of the Out Skerries by SM U-38 (Imperial German Navy). Her crew survived. |
| Star of Bethlehem | United Kingdom | World War I: The drifter was shelled and sunk in the North Sea 40 nautical miles (74 km) east north east of the Out Skerries by SM U-38 (Imperial German Navy). Her crew survived. |
| Viceroy | United Kingdom | World War I: The trawler was shelled and sunk in the North Sea 50 nautical miles (93 km) east north east of the Out Skerries by SM U-38 (Imperial German Navy). Her crew survived. |
| Vine | United Kingdom | World War I: The trawler was shelled and sunk in the North Sea 30 nautical miles (56 km) north east by east of the Out Skerries by SM U-38 (Imperial German Navy). Her crew survived. |

== 26 June ==
List of shipwrecks: 26 June 1915
| Ship | State | Description |
|---|---|---|
| Campania | United Kingdom | World War I: The trawler was shelled and sunk in the North Sea 60 nautical miles (110 km) north of Hoy Head, Orkney Islands by SM U-39 (Imperial German Navy). Her crew survived. |
| Torpedinere 5 pn | Regia Marina | World War I: The torpedo boat was sunk in the Gulf of Venice by SM UB-1 (Imperial German Navy). |

== 27 June ==
List of shipwrecks: 27 June 1915
| Ship | State | Description |
|---|---|---|
| Edith | United Kingdom | World War I: The schooner was shelled and sunk in the Atlantic Ocean 10 nautical miles (19 km) south east of Capel Island, County Cork by SM U-24 (Imperial German Navy). Her crew survived. |
| Indrani | United Kingdom | World War I: The cargo ship was torpedoed and sunk in St. George's Channel 36 nautical miles (67 km) south west of the Tuskar Rock by SM U-24 (Imperial German Navy). Her crew survived. |
| Lucena | United Kingdom | World War I: The coaster was shelled and sunk in the Atlantic Ocean 4 nautical miles (7.4 km) south of Capel Island by SM U-24 (Imperial German Navy). Her crew survived. |
| 5 PN | Regia Marina | World War I: The PN-class torpedo boat was torpedoed and sunk in the Gulf of Venice by SM UB-10 (Imperial German Navy). |

== 28 June ==
List of shipwrecks: 28 June 1915
| Ship | State | Description |
|---|---|---|
| Armenian | United Kingdom | World War I: The White Star Line-owned cargo ship was torpedoed and sunk in the Atlantic Ocean (50°40′N 6°24′W) by SM U-24 (Imperial German Navy) with the loss of 29 crew. Survivors were rescued by President Stevens (Belgium). |
| SMS Bunte Kuh | Imperial German Navy | The Vorpostenboot was lost on this date. |
| Dumfriesshire | United Kingdom | World War I: The barque was torpedoed and sunk in the Atlantic Ocean 25 nautical miles (46 km) off the Smalls Lighthouse by SM U-24 (Imperial German Navy). Her crew was rescued by HMT Weymouth II (Royal Navy). |

== 29 June ==
List of shipwrecks: 29 June 1915
| Ship | State | Description |
|---|---|---|
| Cambuskenneth | Norway | World War I: The full-rigged ship was sunk in the Atlantic Ocean 26 nautical miles (48 km) south west by south of Galley Head, County Cork, United Kingdom by SM U-39 (Imperial German Navy). Her crew survived. |
| Glynymel | United Kingdom | The cargo ship broke in two at Devonport, Devon whilst discharging a cargo of coal. |
| Kotka | Norway | World War I: The sailing ship was damaged in the Atlantic Ocean 30 nautical miles (56 km) south west by west of the Bull Rock Lighthouse, County Cork by SM U-39 (Imperial German Navy). She was beached but was later refloated, repaired and returned to service. |

== 30 June ==
List of shipwrecks: 30 June 1915
| Ship | State | Description |
|---|---|---|
| HMS Lightning | Royal Navy | World War I: The Janus-class destroyer struck a mine in the Thames Estuary off the Kentish Knock lightship (United Kingdom). She broke in two, the bow section sinking with the loss of fifteen of her crew. The stern section was towed to Sheerness, Kent where it was later scrapped. |
| Lomas | United Kingdom | World War I: The cargo ship was torpedoed and sunk in the Atlantic Ocean 65 nautical miles (120 km) west of the Bishop Rock, Isles of Scilly (49°30′N 8°15′W) by SM U-39 (Imperial German Navy) with the loss of a crew member. |
| Oscar II | Sweden | World War I: The cargo ship was sunk at (59°23′N 10°14′W) after a collision with the British auxiliary cruiser Patuca (Royal Navy). No casualties. |
| Scottish Monarch | United Kingdom | World War I: The cargo ship was shelled and sunk in the Atlantic Ocean 40 nautical miles (74 km) south of the Ballycotton Lighthouse, County Cork (51°10′N 8°00′W) by SM U-24 (Imperial German Navy) with the loss of fifteen of her seventeen crew. The survivors were rescued by the trawler 483 (United Kingdom). |
| HMT Thistle IV | Royal Navy | The naval trawler collided with another vessel in the Irish Sea off Great Orme Head, Caernarfonshire and sank. |
| Thistlebank | Norway | World War I: The barque was sunk in the Atlantic Ocean 25 nautical miles (46 km) south west of the Fastnet Rock (51°09′N 9°50′W) by SM U-24 (Imperial German Navy). Her crew survived. |
| SM UC-2 | Imperial German Navy | World War I: The Type UC 1 submarine struck a mine and sank in the North Sea off Lowestoft, Suffolk, United Kingdom. |

== Unknown date ==
List of shipwrecks: Unknown date 1915
| Ship | State | Description |
|---|---|---|
| Krimpen | Italy | The cargo ship collided with Den of Ewnie (United Kingdom) at Port Said, Egypt and sank. |
| Polaris | United States | The fishing schooner ran aground on Klawack Reef at the north end of Fish Egg Island in the Territory of Alaska. The survey ship USC&GS Thomas R. Gedney ( United States Coast and Geodetic Survey) came to her assistance on 12 June and helped refloat her. |
| Mosvalla | United Kingdom | The whaler foundered with the loss of all hands. She was on a voyage from Saldanha, Western Cape, South Africa to Table Bay. |
| Zweema | United Kingdom | The cargo ship struck a rock and foundered in the Madura Strait. |
| Zippora | Sweden | The wooden galeas departed in the beginning of June from Gothenburg. No further trace, presumed foundered in the Baltic Sea with the loss of the crew of four. |
