= SM U-25 =

German submarine

History

German Empire
- Name: U-25
- Ordered: 18 March 1911
- Builder: Germaniawerft, Kiel
- Yard number: 179
- Laid down: 7 May 1912
- Launched: 12 July 1913
- Commissioned: 9 May 1914
- Fate: 23 February 1919 - Surrendered to France. Broken up at Cherburg in 1921-2.

General characteristics Ocean-going diesel submarine
- Class & type: Type U 23 submarine
- Displacement: 669 t (658 long tons) surfaced; 864 t (850 long tons) submerged
- Length: 64.70 m (212.3 ft)
- Beam: 6.32 m (20 ft 9 in)
- Draught: 3.45 m (11 ft 4 in)
- Propulsion: 2 shafts; 2 × Germania 6-cylinder two stroke diesel motors with 1,800 PS (1,320 kW; 1,780 shp); 2 × SSW double Motordynamos with 1,200 PS (880 kW; 1,180 shp); 450rpm surfaced; 330 rpm submerged
- Speed: 16.7 knots (30.9 km/h; 19.2 mph) surfaced; 10.3 knots (19.1 km/h; 11.9 mph) submerged
- Range: 7,620 nmi (14,110 km; 8,770 mi) at 8 knots (15 km/h; 9.2 mph) surfaced; 85 nmi (157 km; 98 mi) at 5 knots (9.3 km/h; 5.8 mph) submerged
- Test depth: about 50 m (160 ft)
- Boats & landing craft carried: 1 dingi
- Complement: 4 officers, 31 men
- Armament: 4 × 50 cm (19.7 in) torpedo tubes (2 each bow and stern); 6 torpedoes; 1 × 8.8 cm (3.5 in) SK L/30 gun

Service record
- Part of: IV Flotilla; 1 August 1914 – Unknown end; Training Flotilla; Unknown start – 11 November 1918
- Commanders: Kptlt. Otto Wünsche; 9 May 1914 – 15 September 1915; Kptlt. Alfred Saalwächter unknown; Kptlt. Emil Heusinger von Waldegg; 23 October - 29 December 1917
- Operations: 3 patrols
- Victories: 21 merchant ships sunk (14,145 GRT); 1 merchant ships damaged (163 GRT)

SM U-25 (Note: "SM" stands for "Seiner Majestät" (English: His Majesty's) and combined with the U for Unterseeboot would be translated as His Majesty's Submarine.) was one of the 329 submarines serving in the Imperial German Navy in World War I.

U-25 was engaged in the naval warfare and took part in the First Battle of the Atlantic.

== Summary of raiding history ==
Date	Name	Nationality	Tonnage (Note: Tonnages are in gross register tons)	Fate
7 June 1915	Glittertind	Norway	717	Sunk
7 June 1915	Nottingham	United Kingdom	165	Sunk
7 June 1915	Pentland	United Kingdom	204	Sunk
7 June 1915	Saturn	United Kingdom	183	Sunk
7 June 1915	Velocity	United Kingdom	186	Sunk
9 June 1915	Cardiff	United Kingdom	163	Sunk
9 June 1915	Castor	United Kingdom	182	Sunk
9 June 1915	J. Leyman	United Kingdom	197	Sunk
9 June 1915	Tunisian	United Kingdom	211	Sunk
4 July 1915	Sunbeam	United Kingdom	132	Sunk
8 July 1915	Anna	Russian Empire	2,000	Sunk
8 July 1915	Guido	United Kingdom	2,093	Sunk
9 July 1915	Nordaas	Norway	1,111	Sunk
11 July 1915	Hainton	United Kingdom	156	Sunk
11 July 1915	Syrian	United Kingdom	176	Sunk
11 July 1915	Fleetwood	United Kingdom	163	Damaged
6 August 1915	Maj	Sweden	920	Sunk
7 August 1915	Norman	Norway	1,060	Sunk
10 August 1915	Aura	Norway	396	Sunk
14 August 1915	Albis	Norway	1,381	Sunk
17 August 1915	Mineral	Norway	649	Sunk
19 August 1915	Bras	Norway	1,863	Sunk

== Bibliography ==
- Gröner, Erich; Jung, Dieter; Maass, Martin (1991). U-boats and Mine Warfare Vessels. German Warships 1815–1945. Vol. 2. Translated by Thomas, Keith; Magowan, Rachel. London: Conway Maritime Press. ISBN 0-85177-593-4.
