= HMS Recruit (1916) =

Destroyer of the Royal Navy

History

United Kingdom
- Name: Recruit
- Builder: William Doxford & Sons, Sunderland
- Launched: 9 December 1916
- Commissioned: April 1917
- Fate: Sunk by SM UB-16, 9 August 1917

General characteristics (as built)
- Class & type: R-class destroyer
- Displacement: 1,072 long tons (1,089 t) (normal)
- Length: 276 ft 1 in (84.2 m) (o/a)
- Beam: 26 ft 9 in (8.2 m)
- Draught: 9 ft (2.7 m)
- Installed power: 3 × Yarrow boilers; 27,000 shp (20,000 kW)
- Propulsion: 2 Shafts; 1 geared steam turbine
- Speed: 36 knots (67 km/h; 41 mph)
- Range: 3,450 nmi (6,390 km; 3,970 mi) at 15 knots (28 km/h; 17 mph)
- Complement: 80
- Armament: 3 × single 4 in (102 mm) guns; 1 × single 2 pdr (40 mm (1.6 in)) AA gun; 2 × twin 21 in (533 mm) torpedo tubes

HMS Recruit was an R-class destroyer built for the Royal Navy during the First World War. She was sunk by a German U-boat four months after she was commissioned in April 1917.

== Description ==
The Admiralty R class were enlarged versions of the preceding Admiralty M class fitted with geared steam turbines. They displaced 1,072 long tons (1,089 t) at normal load. The ships had an overall length of 276 feet 1 inch (84.2 m), a beam of 26 feet 9 inches (8.2 m) and a draught of 9 feet (2.7 m). Recruit was powered by a single Parsons geared steam turbine that drove two propeller shafts using steam provided by three Yarrow boilers. The turbines developed a total of 27,000 shaft horsepower (20,000 kW) and gave a maximum speed of 36 knots (67 km/h; 41 mph). The ships carried a maximum of 245 long tons (249 t) of fuel oil that gave them a range of 3,450 nautical miles (6,390 km; 3,970 mi) at 15 knots (28 km/h; 17 mph). The ships' complement was 80 officers and ratings.

The Admiralty Rs were armed with three single QF 4-inch (102 mm) Mark IV guns. One gun was positioned on the forecastle; the second was on a platform between the funnels and the third at the stern. They were equipped with a single QF 2-pounder (40 mm (1.6 in)) "pom-pom" anti-aircraft gun, on a platform between the two rotating twin mounts for 21-inch (533 mm) torpedoes amidships.

== Construction and career ==
Recruit was ordered under the Sixth War Programme from William Doxford & Sons. The ship was laid down at the company's Sunderland shipyard at an unknown date, launched on 28 October 1916 and commissioned in April 1917.

In May 1917 the vessel was assigned to the Tenth Destroyer Flotilla as part of the Harwich Force. The destroyer was sunk by a torpedo from the submarine SM UB-16 on 9 August 1917 in the North Sea 3 nmi (5.6 km; 3.5 mi) north of the Noord Hinder lightvessel, with 53 crewmen lost.

== Bibliography ==
- Colledge, J. J.; Warlow, Ben (2006) [1969]. Ships of the Royal Navy: The Complete Record of All Fighting Ships of the Royal Navy from the 15th Century to the Present (3rd Rev ed.). London: Chatham Publishing. ISBN 978-1-86176-281-8. OCLC 67375475.
- Dittmar, F.J.; Colledge, J.J. (1972). British Warships 1914–1919. Shepperton, UK: Ian Allan. ISBN 0-7110-0380-7.
- Friedman, Norman (2009). British Destroyers: From Earliest Days to the Second World War. Barnsley, UK: Seaforth Publishing. ISBN 978-1-84832-049-9.
- Gardiner, Robert & Gray, Randal, eds. (1985). Conway's All The World's Fighting Ships 1906–1921. London: Conway Maritime Press. ISBN 0-85177-245-5.
- March, Edgar J. (1966). British Destroyers: A History of Development, 1892–1953; Drawn by Admiralty Permission From Official Records & Returns, Ships' Covers & Building Plans. London: Seeley Service. OCLC 164893555.
- Monograph No. 35: Home Waters Part IX: 1st May 1917 to 31st July 1917 (PDF). Naval Staff Monographs (Historical). Vol. XIX. Naval Staff, Training and Staff Duties Division. 1939.
