= SM UB-16 =

Type UB I submarine in the German Imperial Navy

- SM UB-16

History

German Empire
- Name: UB-16
- Ordered: 25 November 1914
- Builder: AG Weser, Bremen
- Yard number: 225
- Laid down: 21 February 1915
- Launched: 26 April 1915
- Commissioned: 12 May 1915
- Fate: Sunk on 10 May 1918

General characteristics
- Class & type: Type UB I submarine
- Displacement: 127 t (125 long tons) surfaced; 141 t (139 long tons) submerged
- Length: 27.88 m (91 ft 6 in) (o/a)
- Beam: 3.15 m (10 ft 4 in)
- Draught: 3.03 m (9 ft 11 in)
- Propulsion: 1 × propeller shaft; 1 × Körting 4-cylinder diesel engine, 59 bhp (44 kW); 1 × Siemens-Schuckert electric motor, 119 shp (89 kW)
- Speed: 7.45 knots (13.80 km/h; 8.57 mph) surfaced; 6.24 knots (11.56 km/h; 7.18 mph) submerged
- Range: 1,500 nmi (2,800 km; 1,700 mi) at 5 knots (9.3 km/h; 5.8 mph) surfaced; 45 nmi (83 km; 52 mi) at 4 knots (7.4 km/h; 4.6 mph) submerged
- Test depth: 50 metres (160 ft)
- Complement: 14
- Armament: 2 × 45 cm (17.7 in) bow torpedo tubes; 2 × torpedoes; 1 × 8 mm (0.31 in) machine gun
- Notes: 33-second diving time

Service record
- Part of: Flanders Flotilla; 1 June 1915 – 10 May 1918
- Commanders: Oblt. Hans Valentiner; 12 May 1915 – 4 April 1916; Oblt. Paul Hundius; 5 April – 29 August 1916; Oblt. Ernst Müller-Schwarz; 30 August 1916 – 19 January 1917; Oblt. Hans Ewald Niemer; 20 January – 17 March 1917; Oblt. Hugo Thielmann; 18 March – 22 April 1917; Oblt. Wilhelm Rhein; 23 April – 25 August 1917; Oblt. Günther Bachmann; 26 August – 24 December 1917; Oblt. Alfred Krameyer; 25 December 1917 – 19 February 1918; Oblt. Rudolf Stier; 20 February – 21 April 1918; Oblt. Vicco von der Lühe; 22 April – 10 May 1918
- Operations: 87 patrols
- Victories: 24 merchant ships sunk (18,711 GRT); 1 warship sunk (1,075 tons); 1 merhchant ship damaged (5,822 GRT); 1 merhchant ship taken as prize (Unknown GRT)

SM UB-16 was a German Type UB I submarine or U-boat in the German Imperial Navy (German: Kaiserliche Marine) during World War I. The submarine was sunk by a British submarine in May 1918.

UB-16 was ordered in November 1914 and was laid down at the AG Weser shipyard in Bremen in February 1915. UB-16 was a little under 28 metres (92 ft) in length and displaced between 127 and 141 tonnes (125 and 139 long tons), depending on whether surfaced or submerged. She carried two torpedoes for her two bow torpedo tubes and was also armed with a deck-mounted machine gun. UB-16 was broken into sections and shipped by rail to Antwerp for reassembly. She was launched in April 1915 and commissioned as SM UB-16 in May. (Note: "SM" stands for "Seiner Majestät" (English: His Majesty's) and combined with the U for Unterseeboot would be translated as His Majesty's Submarine.)

UB-16 spent her entire career in the Flanders Flotilla and sank 24 merchant ships, about half of them British fishing vessels. The U-boat was also responsible for sinking the new British destroyer HMS Recruit in 1917. In 1918, UB-16 was converted into a minelayer with the replacement of her torpedo tubes with four mine chutes. On 10 May 1918, UB-16 was torpedoed by the British submarine HMS E34 off the British east coast. Of the 16 men on board, only UB-16's commander survived the attack.

== Design and construction ==
After the German Army's rapid advance along the North Sea coast in the earliest stages of World War I, the German Imperial Navy found itself without suitable submarines that could be operated in the narrow and shallow seas off Flanders. Project 34, a design effort begun in mid-August 1914, produced the Type UB I design: a small submarine that could be shipped by rail to a port of operations and quickly assembled. Constrained by railroad size limitations, the UB I design called for a boat about 28 metres (92 ft) long and displacing about 125 tonnes (123 long tons) with two torpedo tubes. (Note: A further refinement of the design—replacing the torpedo tubes with mine chutes but changing little else—evolved into the Type UC I coastal minelaying submarine. See: Miller, p. 458.)

UB-16 and sister boat UB-17 comprised an order of two submarines placed on 25 November from AG Weser of Bremen, a little more than three months after planning for the class began. UB-16 was laid down by Weser in Bremen on 21 February 1915. As built, UB-16 was 27.88 metres (91 ft 6 in) long, 3.15 metres (10 ft 4 in) abeam, and had a draught of 3.03 metres (9 ft 11 in). She had a single 59-brake-horsepower (44 kW) Körting 4-cylinder diesel engine for surface travel, and a single 119-shaft-horsepower (89 kW) Siemens-Schuckert electric motor for underwater travel, both attached to a single propeller shaft. Her top speeds were 7.45 knots (13.80 km/h; 8.57 mph), surfaced, and 6.24 knots (11.56 km/h; 7.18 mph), submerged. At more moderate speeds, she could sail up to 1,500 nautical miles (2,800 km; 1,700 mi) on the surface before refueling, and up to 45 nautical miles (83 km; 52 mi) submerged before recharging her batteries. Like all boats of the class, UB-16 was rated to a diving depth of 50 metres (160 ft), and could completely submerge in 33 seconds.

UB-16 was armed with two 45-centimeter (17.7 in) torpedoes in two bow torpedo tubes. She was also outfitted for a single 8-millimeter (0.31 in) machine gun on deck. UB-16's standard complement consisted of one officer and thirteen enlisted men.

After work on UB-16 was complete at the Weser yard, she was readied for rail shipment. The process of shipping a UB I boat involved breaking the submarine down into what was essentially a knock down kit. Each boat was broken into approximately fifteen pieces and loaded onto eight railway flatcars. In early 1915, the sections of UB-16 were shipped to Antwerp for assembly in what was typically a two- to three-week process. After UB-16 was assembled and launched on 26 April, she was loaded on a barge and taken through canals to Bruges where she underwent trials.

== Early career ==
The submarine was commissioned into the German Imperial Navy as SM UB-16 on 12 May 1915 under the command of Oberleutnant zur See (Oblt.) Hans Valentiner, a 26-year-old first-time U-boat commander. (Note: Valentiner was in the Navy's April 1907 cadet class with 34 other future U-boat captains, including Werner Fürbringer, Heino von Heimburg, Hans Howaldt, Otto Steinbrinck, and Ralph Wenninger. See: Helgason, Guðmundur. "WWI Officer Crews: Crew 4/07". German and Austrian U-boats of World War I - Kaiserliche Marine - Uboat.net.) On 1 June, UB-16 joined the Flanders Flotilla (German: U-boote des Marinekorps U-Flotille Flandern), which had been organized on 29 March. When UB-16 joined the flotilla, Germany was in the midst of its first submarine offensive, begun in February. During this campaign, enemy vessels in the German-defined war zone (German: Kriegsgebiet), which encompassed all waters around the United Kingdom, were to be sunk. Vessels of neutral countries were not to be attacked unless they definitively could be identified as enemy vessels operating under a false flag.

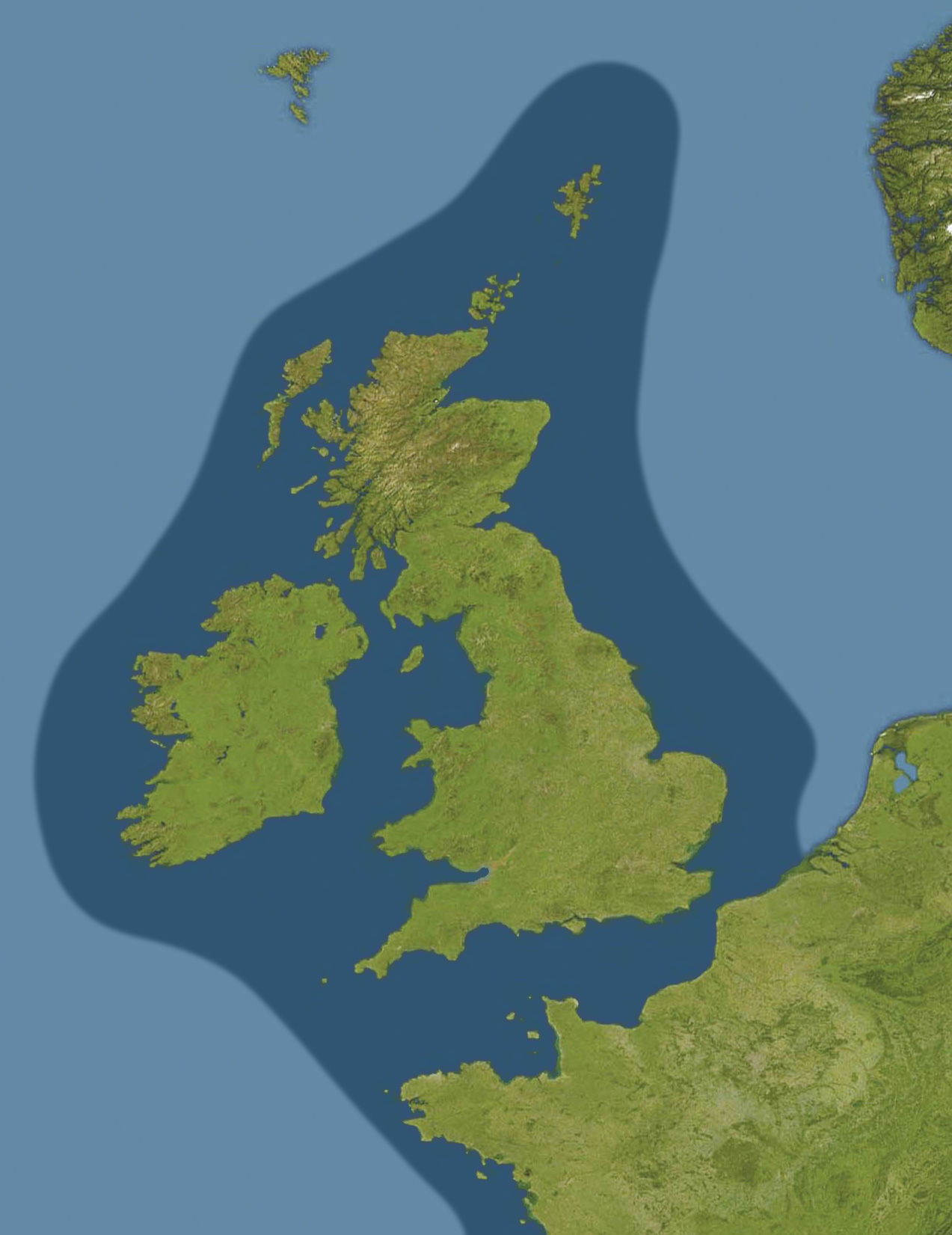
The German war zone (German: Kriegsgebiet) for the first submarine offensive.

On 3 June, two days after joining the flotilla, Valentiner and UB-16 stopped and sunk three British smacks — small sailing fishing vessels traditionally rigged with red ochre sails -while patrolling 40 and 50 nautical miles (74 and 93 km; 46 and 58 mi) off Lowestoft.—which were stopped, boarded by crewmen from UB-16, and sunk with explosives. On 12 June, UB-16 torpedoed and sank the 3,027 GRT British cargo ship Leuctra 1.5 nautical miles (2.8 km; 1.7 mi) from the Shipwash Lightship. Nine days later, the U-boat torpedoed the British steamer Tunisiana off Lowestoft. After being hit, the 4,220 GRT ship's master beached her on Barnard Sands to save the cargo of wheat shipped from Montreal, but the ship was a complete loss. Tunisiana was the largest ship sunk by UB-16. In her first month of action, UB-16's totals were five ships sunk of 7,432 GRT, more than half of the flotilla's June total of 14,080 tons. There were no deaths on any of UB-16's June victims.

UB-16's next two successes came on consecutive days in late July. On the 27th, Westward Ho!, a 47 GRT smack was boarded and sunk by UB-16's crew 25 nautical miles (46 km; 29 mi) southeast of Lowestoft. The following day, the 1,821 GRT Mangara was torpedoed without warning one-quarter nautical mile (500 m) from the Sizewell Buoy at Aldeburgh. Eleven men died when the ship and her cargo of iron ore were sent to the bottom.

Although the Flanders Flotilla sank 31 ships in August, UB-16 did not add to that total. In a four-day span in September, however, she accounted for three of the eight ships sunk by the flotilla during the month. On the 7th, she sank two more fishing smacks, Emblem and Victorious, 44 nautical miles (81 km; 51 mi) from Lowestoft. (Note: UB-16 was probably patrolling with sister boat UB-2 during this time. UB-2 is credited with sinking two fishing smacks on 7 September in the same location. See: Helgason, Guðmundur. Helgason, Guðmundur. "Ships hit during WWI: Constance". German and Austrian U-boats of World War I - Kaiserliche Marine - Uboat.net., Helgason, Guðmundur. "Ships hit during WWI: Emanuel". German and Austrian U-boats of World War I - Kaiserliche Marine - Uboat.net. Retrieved 12 March 2009.) On 10 September, UB-16 sank the 51 GRT Nimrod in the same vicinity.

Germany's submarine offensive was suspended on 18 September by the chief of the Admiralstab, Admiral Henning von Holtzendorff, in response to American demands after German submarines had sunk the Cunard Line steamer Lusitania in May 1915 and other high-profile sinkings in August and September. Holtzendorff's directive from ordered all U-boats out of the English Channel and the South-Western Approaches and required that all submarine activity in the North Sea be conducted strictly along prize regulations. UB-16 did not sink any vessels over the next four months, but resumed attacks on 18 January 1916, sinking three more smacks—Evelyn, Foam Crest, and Sunshine—between 25 and 35 nautical miles (46 and 65 km; 29 and 40 mi) from Lowestoft.

== Second submarine offensive ==
By early 1916, the British blockade of Germany was beginning to have an effect on Germany and her imports. The Royal Navy had stopped and seized more cargo destined for Germany than the quantity of cargo sunk by German U-boats in the first submarine offensive. As a result, the German Imperial Navy began a second offensive against merchant shipping on 29 February. The final ground rules agreed upon by the German Admiralstab were that all enemy vessels in Germany's self-proclaimed war zone would be destroyed without warning, that enemy vessels outside the war zone would be destroyed only if armed, and—to avoid antagonizing the United States—that enemy passenger steamers were not to be attacked, regardless of whether in the war zone or not.

Paul Hundius, commander of UB-16 from April to August 1916

UB-16's first successes in the new offensive came on 6 March when she sank the smacks Springflower and Young Harry about 30 nautical miles (56 km; 35 mi) east of Lowestoft. Valentiner and UB-16 attacked another pair of ships in early April. The 653 GRT British ship Perth was torpedoed and sunk near Yarmouth on the 1st, while the Dutch sailing vessel Elziena Helena was sunk in an attack two days later east of Southwold.

On 5 April, Valentiner was succeeded by Kapitänleutnant Paul Hundius, a 27-year-old, first-time U-boat skipper. (Note: Hundius was in the Navy's April 1909 cadet class with 60 other future U-boat captains, including Johannes Lohs. Three of UB-16's later commanders—Hugo Thielmann, Günther Bachmann, and Rudolf Stier—were also members of this cadet class. See: Helgason, Guðmundur. "WWI Officer Crews: Crew 4/09". German and Austrian U-boats of World War I - Kaiserliche Marine - Uboat.net.) In the first two weeks under Hundius' command, UB-16 sank two British steamers: the 2,978 GRT Robert Adamson on the 10th, and the 3,091 GRT Tregantle on the 22nd. Robert Adamson was sunk 3 nautical miles (5.6 km; 3.5 mi) from the Shipwash Lightship while en route from Dundee to Le Havre with a cargo of props. Tregantle had sailed from Galveston, Texas, via Norfolk, Virginia, with a load of wheat for Hull, but was sunk off Lowestoft.

Near the end of April 1916, Admiral Reinhardt Scheer, the newest commander-in-chief of the German High Seas Fleet, called off the merchant shipping offensive and ordered all boats at sea to return, and all boats in port to remain there. UB-16 did not sink any more ships for the next eight months.

== Grand Fleet ambush attempts ==
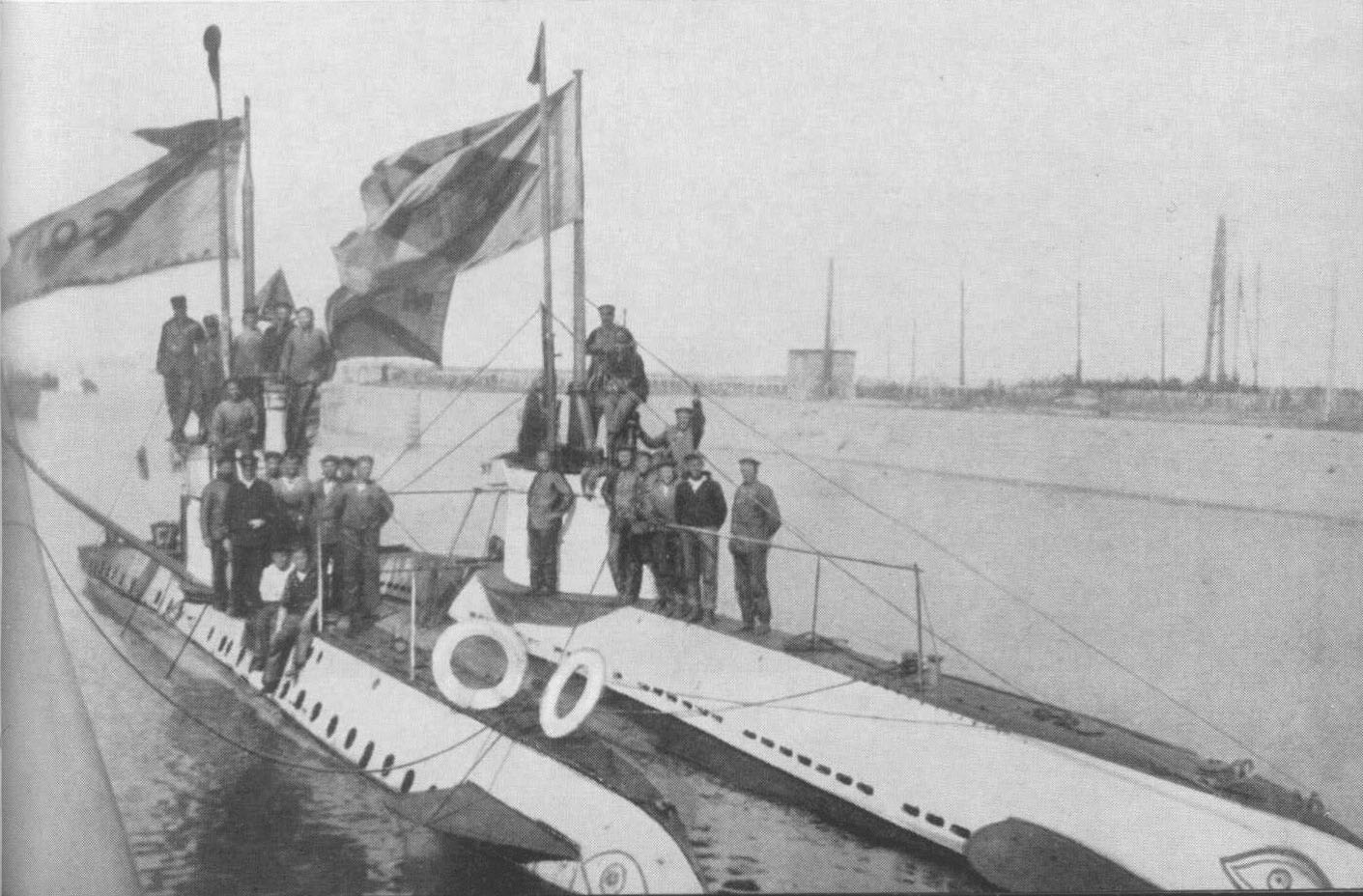
SM UB-2 and SM UB-16 in the harbor of Zeebrügge

In mid-May, Scheer completed plans to draw out part of the British Grand Fleet. The German High Seas Fleet would sortie for a raid on Sunderland, luring the British fleet across "'nests' of submarines and mine-fields". In support of the operation, UB-16 and five other Flanders boats set out at midnight 30/31 May to form a line 18 nautical miles (33 km; 21 mi) east of Lowestoft. (Note: The other five boats for the May action were UB-6, UB-10, UB-12, UB-17, and UB-29.) This group was to intercept and attack the British light forces from Harwich, should they sortie north to join the battle. Unfortunately for the Germans, the British Admiralty had intelligence reports of the departure of the submarines which, coupled with an absence of attacks on shipping, aroused British suspicions.

A delayed departure of the German High Seas Fleet for its sortie (which had been redirected to the Skagerrak) and the failure of several of the U-boats stationed to the north to receive the coded message warning of the British advance caused Scheer's anticipated ambush to be a "complete and disappointing failure". In UB-16's group, only UB-10 sighted the Harwich forces, and they were too far away to mount an attack. The failure of the submarine ambush to sink any British capital ships allowed the full Grand Fleet to engage the numerically inferior High Seas Fleet in the Battle of Jutland, which took place 31 May – 1 June.

UB-16's activities over the next two months are not reported, but on 2 August the submarine was patrolling off the Mass Lightship and torpedoed the Norwegian steamer John Wilson, sending her cargo of food destined for London to the bottom. Later in August, Scheer set up another ambush for the British fleet, when he drew up plans for another High Seas Fleet raid on Sunderland (as had been the original intention in May). The German fleet planned to depart late in the day on 18 August and shell military targets the next morning. As in May, UB-16 was part of a group intended to attack the Harwich forces. As one of five boats forming the second line of boats from the Flanders Flotilla, (Note: The other four boats for the August action were UB-6, UB-12, UB-19, and UB-37.) UB-16 was stationed off Texel by the morning of 20 August. Once again, British intelligence had given warning of the impending attack and ambush, causing the Grand Fleet to sortie at 16:00 on 18 August, five hours before the German fleet sailed. Faulty intelligence caused Scheer initially to divert from Sunderland, and then to eventually call off the whole operation. Although U-boats to the north sank two British light cruisers, (Note: U-52 sank HMS Nottingham; U-66 and U-63 teamed up to sink HMS Falmouth.) UB-16 and her group played no part in the action.

Later, on 24 August, UB-16 was again patrolling off the Mass Lightship when Hundius stopped Velox, another Norwegian steamer headed for London. Crewmen from UB-16 boarded the 312 GRT cargo ship, planted explosives, and sank the vessel and her general cargo. Velox was the last ship sunk by the UB-16 for nearly eight months, and the last sunk by Hundius before he was replaced by Oblt. Ernst Müller-Schwarz late in the month. Neither Müller-Schwartz, nor his January 1917 replacement, Oblt. Hans Ewald Niemer, sank any ships while in command of UB-16.

== Unrestricted submarine warfare ==
By the time of the so-called "turnip winter" of 1916–17, the Royal Navy blockade of Germany had severely limited imports of food and fuel into Germany. Among the results were an increase in infant mortality and as many as 700,000 deaths attributed to starvation or hypothermia during the war. With the blockade having such dire consequences, Kaiser Wilhelm II personally approved a resumption of unrestricted submarine warfare to begin on 1 February 1917 to help force the British to make peace. The new rules of engagement specified that no ship was to be left afloat.

With the new campaign already underway, Niemer was replaced as UB-16's commander by Oblt. Hugo Thielmann on 18 March. Although only in command of UB-16 for little more than a month, Thielmann sank one ship on UB-16. The 107 GRT Dutch motor vessel Arie was sunk in the Hoofden area on 20 April; there were no reports of casualties.

Kapitänleutnant Wilhelm Rhein was assigned to UB-16 on 23 April, and under his command, UB-16 may have been responsible for damaging the Norwegian cargo ship Kongsli on 26 April. (Note: According to Uboat.net, Kongsli is identified as being damaged by UB-16 on 26 April 1917 under the command of Kurt Siewert. According to the list of commanding officers of UB-16, Wilhelm Rhein was in command of UB-16 on that date. Further, Kurt Siewert is not listed as commanding officer of any U-boat until assuming command of UC-31 on 21 July 1917.) On 9 August, UB-16 torpedoed and sank the British destroyer HMS Recruit 3 nautical miles (5.6 km; 3.5 mi) from the North Hinder Lightship. Recruit, commissioned four months earlier, sank with 54 of her complement. (Note: Coincidentally, the previous Recruit, a destroyer launched in 1896, had been sunk by UB-6, a sister boat of UB-16 in May 1915. See: Helgason, Guðmundur. "Ships hit during WWI: Recruit (hms)". German and Austrian U-boats of World War I - Kaiserliche Marine - Uboat.net.) Rhein was succeeded by Oblt. Günther Bachmann on 26 August, and he, in turn, was succeeded by Oblt. Alfred Krameyer on 25 December.

== Conversion to minelayer ==
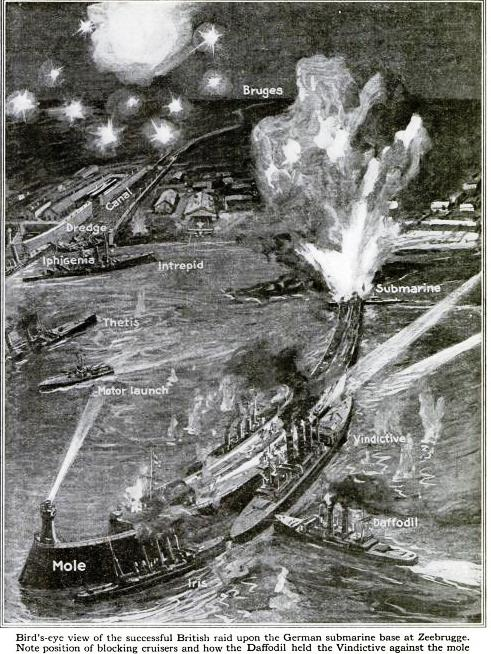
Despite the fact that the British Zeebrugge Raid partially blocked the canal on 28 April 1918, UB-16 sortied from Zebrugge the following day.

UB-16 and three sister boats, UB-10, UB-12, and UB-17, had all been converted to minelaying submarines by 1918. The conversion involved removing the bow section containing the pair of torpedo tubes from each U-boat and replacing it with a new bow containing four mine chutes capable of carrying two mines each. In the process, the boats were lengthened to 105 feet (32 m), and the displacement increased to 147 t (145 long tons) on the surface, and 161 t (158 long tons) below the surface. Exactly when this conversion was performed on UB-16 is not reported, but UB-12 was at the dockyard from November 1916 to January 1917. The lack of reported successes by UB-16 during this same span makes it a possibility that her conversion was accomplished in a similar timeframe.

On 13 March, UB-16, now under the command of Oblt. Rudolf Stier, was responsible for sinking the 895 GRT steamer Lisette near the Shipwash Lightship. One month later, on 13 April, the fishing smack Ruth was boarded and sunk by UB-16; Ruth was the final ship sunk by UB-16.

On 28 April, British forces attempted to block the canal at Zeebrugge and bottle up the vessels of the Flanders Flotilla in the Zeebrugge Raid. In the raid, the British succeeded in sinking two obsolete cruisers, Iphigenia and Intrepid, in the narrowest part of the canal. British admiral Roger Keyes, who had planned the raid, believed that the Flanders Flotilla ships were bottled up for a long period of time. However, the following day, after the Germans had removed two piers, UB-16—under Oblt. Vicco von der Lühe, her newest commander—made the first sortie from Zeebrugge after the raid.

== Sinking ==
UB-16 departed Zeebrugge for what would be the final time on 6 May 1918 for a patrol off Harwich. At 18:50 on 10 May, the British submarine HMS E34 spotted UB-16 on the surface near Harwich. Although E34's commanding officer Lieutenant Pulleyne initially believed that UB-16 was a British submarine, he submerged out of caution because of UB-16's proximity to Harwich. After identifying the submarine as a German boat, Pulleyne maneuvered to attack. At 19:15, E34 launched two torpedoes at UB-16 from a distance of 400 yards (370 m). The first hit UB-16's bow and failed to detonate, but the second hit below the conning tower and exploded, sinking UB-16 at position 52°6′N 2°1′E in less than five minutes. After a further five minutes, E34 surfaced near where UB-16 had gone down, and rescued von der Lühe from the oily water; he was the only survivor. Von der Lühe was imprisoned in a British prisoner of war camp, where he died of influenza on 1 March 1919. British divers dispatched to the site of UB-16's demise a week later could only find some plating and a few pipes and concluded that UB-16 had disintegrated after the torpedo hit.

== Summary of raiding history ==
Ships sunk or damaged by SM UB-16
Date	Name	Nationality	Tonnage (Note: Merchant ship tonnages are in gross register tons. Military vessels are listed by tons displacement)	Fate
3 June 1915	Boy Horace	United Kingdom	69	Sunk
3 June 1915	E&C	United Kingdom	60	Sunk
3 June 1915	Economy	United Kingdom	69	Sunk
12 June 1915	Leuctra	United Kingdom	3,027	Sunk
23 June 1915	Tunisiana	United Kingdom	4,220	Sunk
27 July 1915	Westward Ho!	United Kingdom	47	Sunk
28 July 1915	Mangara	United Kingdom	1,821	Sunk
7 September 1915	Emblem	United Kingdom	50	Sunk
7 September 1915	Victorious	United Kingdom	43	Sunk
10 September 1915	Nimrod	United Kingdom	51	Sunk
18 January 1916	Evelyn	United Kingdom	55	Sunk
18 January 1916	Foam Crest	United Kingdom	46	Sunk
18 January 1916	Sunshine	United Kingdom	52	Sunk
6 March 1916	Springflower	United Kingdom	59	Sunk
6 March 1916	Young Harry	United Kingdom	43	Sunk
1 April 1916	Perth	United Kingdom	653	Sunk
3 April 1916	Elziena Helena	Netherlands	121	Sunk
10 April 1916	Robert Adamson	United Kingdom	2,978	Sunk
22 April 1916	Tregantle	United Kingdom	3,091	Sunk
27 June 1916	Z 20	Belgium	Unknown	Captured as prize
2 August 1916	John Wilson	Norway	798	Sunk
24 August 1916	Velox	Norway	312	Sunk
20 April 1917	Arie	Netherlands	107	Sunk
26 April 1917	Kongsli	Norway	5,822	Damaged
9 August 1917	HMS Recruit	Royal Navy	1,075	Sunk
13 March 1918	Lisette	United Kingdom	895	Sunk
13 April 1918	Ruth	United Kingdom	44	Sunk
	Sunk: Damaged: Total:	19,786; 5,822; 25,608		

== Bibliography ==
- Bendert, Harald (2000). Die UB-Boote der Kaiserlichen Marine, 1914-1918. Einsätze, Erfolge, Schicksal (in German). Hamburg: Verlag E.S. Mittler & Sohn GmbH. ISBN 3-8132-0713-7.
- Gröner, Erich; Jung, Dieter; Maass, Martin (1991). German Warships 1815–1945, U-boats and Mine Warfare Vessels. Vol. 2. Translated by Thomas, Keith; Magowan, Rachel. London: Conway Maritime Press. ISBN 0-85177-593-4.
- Compton-Hall, Richard (2004) [1991]. Submarines at War, 1914–18. Penzance: Periscope Publishing. ISBN 978-1-904381-21-1. OCLC 57639764.
- Gardiner, Robert; Gray, Randal, eds. (1985). Conway's All the World's Fighting Ships 1906–1921. Annapolis, Maryland: Naval Institute Press. ISBN 978-0-87021-907-8. OCLC 12119866.
- Gibson, R. H.; Maurice Prendergast (2003) [1931]. The German Submarine War, 1914–1918. Annapolis, Maryland: Naval Institute Press. ISBN 9781591143147. OCLC 52924732.
- Grant, Robert M. (2003). U-boat Hunters: Code Breakers, Divers and the Defeat of the U-boats, 1914–1918. Annapolis, Maryland: Naval Institute Press. ISBN 978-1-59114-889-0. OCLC 54688427.
- Karau, Mark D. (2003). Wielding the Dagger: the MarineKorps Flandern and the German War Effort, 1914–1918. Westport, Connecticut: Praeger. ISBN 978-0-313-32475-8. OCLC 51204317.
- Messimer, Dwight R. (2002). Verschollen: World War I U-boat losses. Annapolis, Maryland: Naval Institute Press. ISBN 978-1-55750-475-3. OCLC 231973419.
- Miller, David (2002). The Illustrated Directory of Submarines of the World. St. Paul, Minnesota: MBI Pub. Co. ISBN 978-0-7603-1345-9. OCLC 50208951.
- Tarrant, V. E. (1989). The U-Boat Offensive: 1914–1945. Annapolis, Maryland: Naval Institute Press. ISBN 978-0-87021-764-7. OCLC 20338385.
- Williamson, Gordon (2002). U-boats of the Kaiser's Navy. Oxford: Osprey. ISBN 978-1-84176-362-0. OCLC 48627495.
