= Political prisoners in the United States =

History of political imprisonment in the United States

Political prisoners in the United States have existed through its history and into the present. Prominent US political prisoners have included anti-war socialists, civil rights movement activists, conscientious objectors, and Global War on Terrorism detainees.

Particularly famous political prisoners include Alice Paul, Eugene Debs, Sacco and Vanzetti, Angelo Herndon, Martin Luther King Jr., Angela Davis, Chelsea Manning, and Mahmoud Khalil.

== History ==
A political prisoner is someone persecuted for their political beliefs, their political actions, or for their "threat" to the government, though this term is inherently "fuzzy" because commentators disagree on the acceptable scope of political action.

Imprisonment for mere expression of political beliefs is rare in the modern United States, because free speech and free expression are well-established in law. This was not always the case. For example, the Smith Act (1940) allowed trial and imprisonment of dozens of Communist Party USA leaders for advocating the overthrow of the United States government. This prosecution was only halted by Yates v. United States (1957).

Human rights groups such as Amnesty International argue that, despite these speech protections, US federal and state governments have repeatedly targeted people affiliated with dissident movements for "neutralization" by applying much harsher sentences for real or "framed" crimes, such as during COINTELPRO.

The US has recognized conscientious objection to military service since its founding. However, the US only recognizes blanket objection to all wars, and does not recognize objection to specific wars, which is included in the UDHR's "right to refuse to kill". Many prisoners have been objectors to specific wars (such as World War I, the Vietnam War, the Gulf War, or the Iraq War).

== Scope ==
A 1989 pamphlet titled "Face Reality" from Freedom Now! features the faces of 48 alleged political prisoners

There are no systematic estimates of the present or past scope of political prisoners in the United States. The number of political prisoners cannot be precisely determined. However, Jane Taubner wrote in 1992 that "most of the individuals and organizations investigating the existence of political prisoners in the United States agree that there are a minimum of over 100 political prisoners in America".

During a July 1978 interview with French newspaper Le Matin de Paris, Ambassador to the United Nations Andrew Young caused controversy when he said: "We still have hundreds of people that I would categorize as political prisoners in our prisons. Maybe even thousands, depending on how you categorize them."

In 1988, Peggy Halsey, a senior member of the United Methodist Church General Board of Global Ministries, (Note: Full title: Executive Secretary of the Ministries with Women and Families in Crisis National Program Division of the United Methodist Church General Board of Global Ministries) wrote about inmates of the High Security Unit in FMC Lexington and claimed that "over 100 other inmates are recognized as political prisoners by their respective movements for social change".

In 1990, various left-wing groups supported the Freedom Now! coalition (Note: Full organization name: "Freedom Now! The Campaign for Amnesty and Human Rights of Political Prisoners in the U.S.") and organized a "Special International Tribunal" (or "1990 Tribunal") (Note: Full tribunal name: "Special International Tribunal on the Violation of Human Rights of Political Prisoners and Prisoners of War in United States Prisons and Jails") on political prisoners in the US. The 1990 tribunal was inspired by the 1951 We Charge Genocide petition and modeled on the 1966 Russell Tribunal on Vietnam. Freedom Now! alleged that there are "more than 100 people locked up in U.S. prisons because of their political actions or beliefs". The 1990 Tribunal reached the verdict that political people "have been subjected to disproportionately lengthy prison sentences and to torture, cruel, inhumane and degrading treatment within the U.S. prison system."

Left-wing groups have often argued that mass incarceration in the United States itself represents a form of political imprisonment, given that the "convict class" overwhelmingly come from working class and other marginalized backgrounds. This view was especially popular in some radical prison populations in the 1970s.

== Early notable alleged political prisoners ==
The concepts of "political prisoner" and "prisoner of conscience" were underdeveloped until the post-World War II era, which saw the creation of intergovernmental and international human rights groups like the United Nations Commission on Human Rights (1946) and Amnesty International (1961). The prisoners below were arrested before or during this era:

- The Sedition Act of 1798, part of the Alien and Sedition Acts, was used to prosecute opponents of President John Adams, including Benjamin Franklin Bache (died before trial) for anti-Adams publications in the Philadelphia Aurora; Matthew Lyon (imprisoned 4 months in 1798) for anti-Adams editorials and republishing French revolutionary Joel Barlow's poems; Anthony Haswell (imprisoned 2 months in 1800) for defending Lyon; Thomas Cooper (imprisoned 6 months in 1800) for a broadside against the Acts; James Thomson Callender (imprisoned 9 months in 1800-01) for an anti-Federalist pamphlet; David Brown (imprisoned 18 months in 1800-01) for the Dedham Liberty Pole protest against the Acts; and Charles Holt (imprisoned 6 months in 1800-01) for criticism of Alexander Hamilton and the standing army. In 1801, newly elected President Thomas Jefferson pardoned all violators of the Acts.

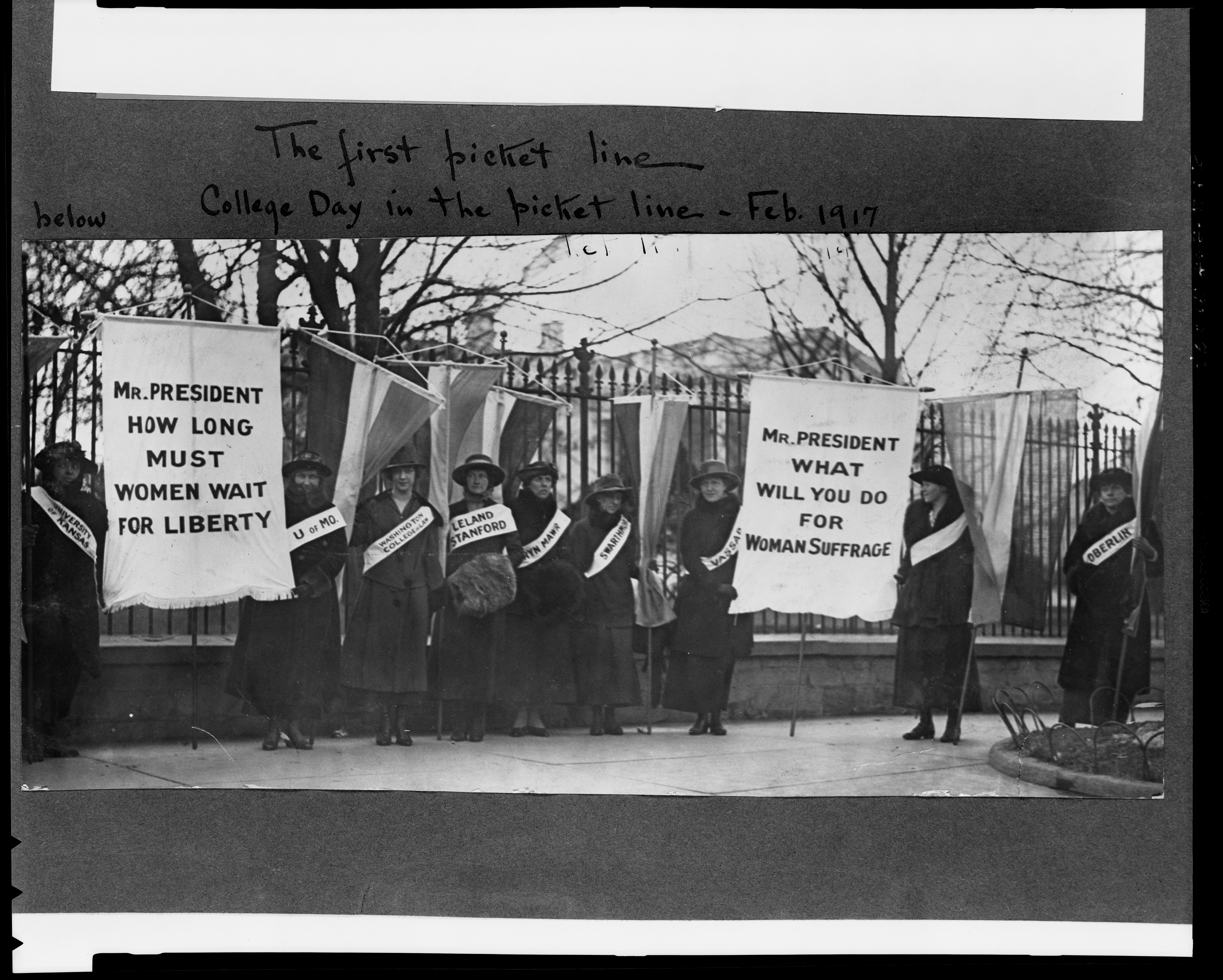
Silent Sentinels picketing the White House

- Alice Paul (imprisoned 1917), a feminist, was incarcerated for peacefully picketing for women's suffrage. Paul explicitly described herself as a political prisoner in efforts that led to the 19th Amendment. Other feminists arrested for picketing for women's suffrage led the 1919 Prison Special train tour.

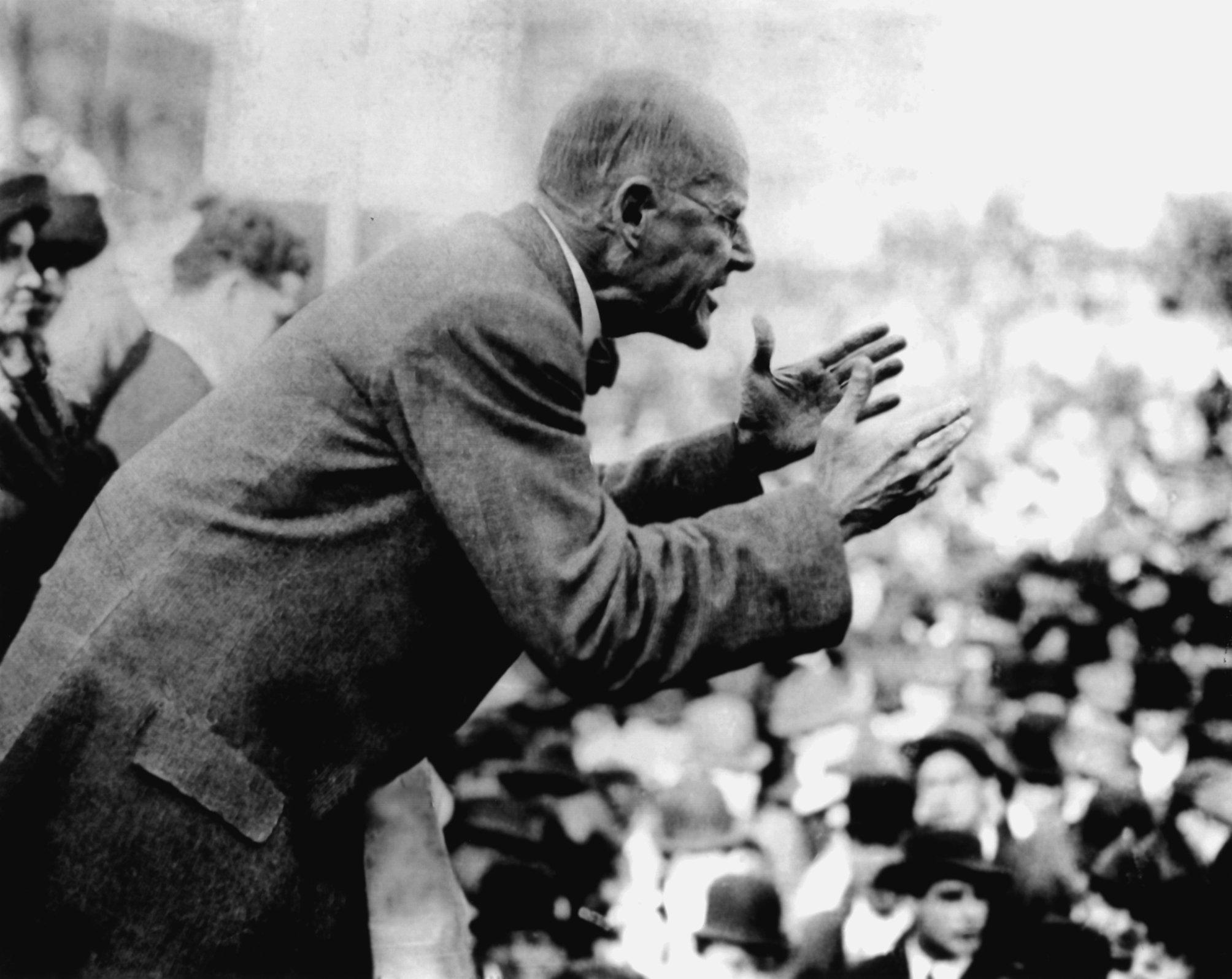
Debs speaking in Canton, Ohio, in 1918, before his arrest for sedition

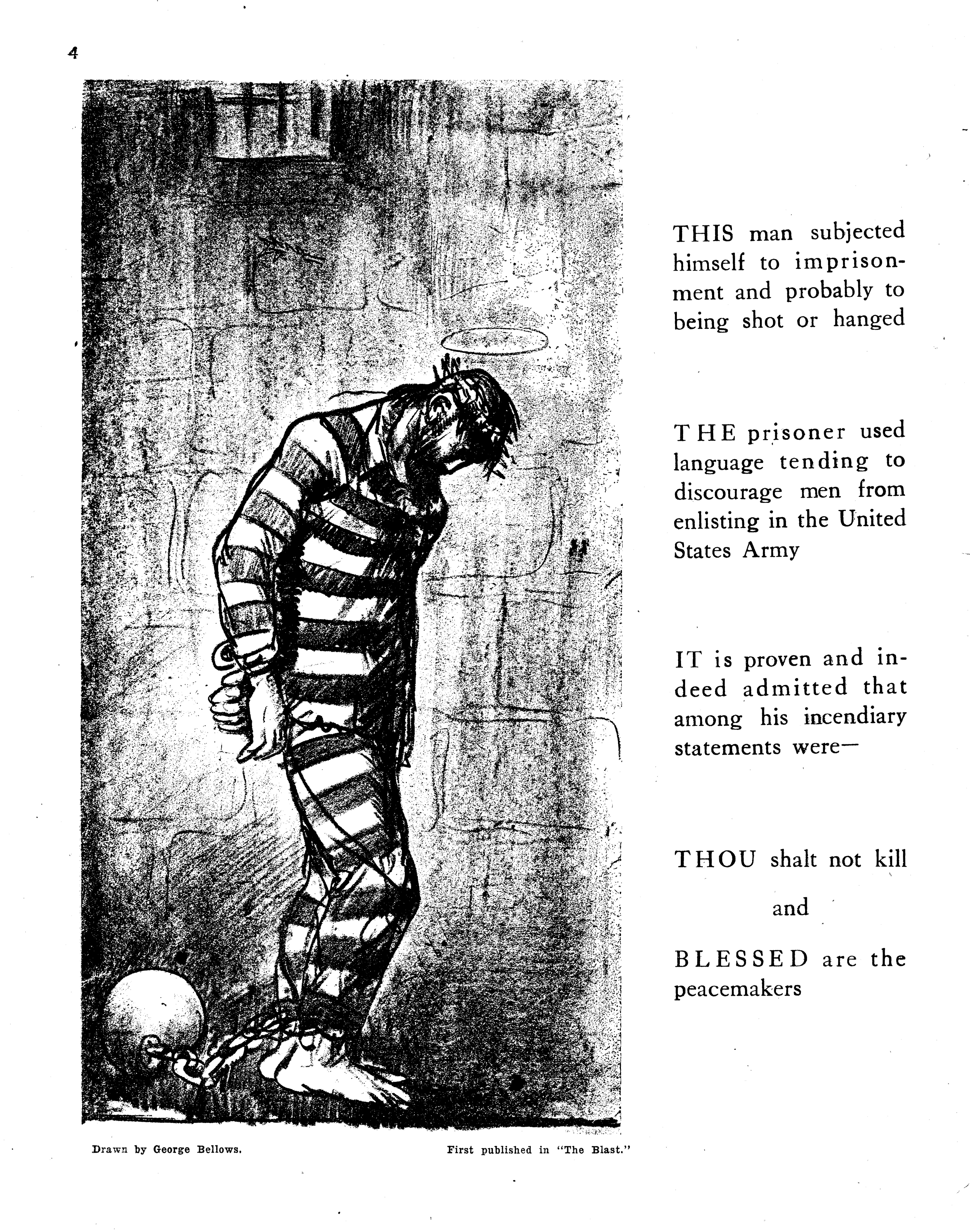
Blessed are the Peacemakers by George Bellows, The Masses 1917

- During World War 1, the Espionage Act of 1917 and Sedition Act of 1918 prohibited any "disloyal" statement about the US government, the US Constitution, or military conscription. Thousands of Americans were jailed for violating these acts, including many members of the Socialist Party of America and Industrial Workers of the World. Liberal opposition to the Acts and defense of conscientious objectors birthed the National Civil Liberties Bureau (CLB), later renamed the American Civil Liberties Union (ACLU).
  - Charles Schenck (imprisoned 1919–1920) and Elizabeth Baer (imprisoned 1918–1919), members of the Executive Committee of the Socialist Party in Philadelphia, were convicted of sedition for distributing 15,000 anti-conscription leaflets to conscripted men. In March 1919, the Supreme Court upheld their conviction and the Acts as constitutional in Schenck v. United States.
  - Eugene Debs (imprisoned 1919–1921), an anti-war socialist, was convicted of 10 counts of sedition for opposing US involvement in World War 1. On September 18, 1918, he was sentenced to ten years in prison and life disenfranchisement. In March 1919, the Supreme Court upheld Debs' conviction and again upheld the constitutionality of the Acts in Debs v. United States. On April 13, 1919, Debs was imprisoned. On May Day 1919, protests of Debs's imprisonment led to the May Day riots of 1919 in Cleveland, after which Socialist Party offices in Cleveland were looted and burned by conservatives. While in prison, he ran in the 1920 United States presidential election, receiving 919,799 votes (3.4 percent), the highest number of votes for a Socialist Party presidential candidate in the United States. In late 1921, Debs' sentence was commuted by President Warren G. Harding.
  - The "Four Russians" (Jacob Abrams, Hyman Lachowsky, Samuel Lipman, and Mollie Steimer), anarchist immigrants from Russia who supported the revolution against the Tsar of Russia, were convicted of sedition for producing leaflets against the 1918 US invasion of Russia. In November 1919, the Supreme Court upheld their convictions and the constitutionality of the Acts in Abrams v. United States. The Four Russians were imprisoned until 1921, when they were pardoned, exiled from the United States, and shipped to the Soviet Union.
  - Victor L. Berger (convicted, never imprisoned) was convicted of sedition in 1919 for his anti-war newspaper articles. In 1921, the Supreme Court accepted Berger's appeal and overturned his conviction in Berger v. United States, on the basis that the judge had staunch anti-German biases, but did not rule on the Acts. As a result of his felony conviction, the House of Representatives twice denied Berger his seat in Congress.
- Anita Whitney (imprisoned in 1920) was convicted of "criminal syndicalism" under the California Criminal Syndicalism Act for her membership in the Communist Party USA. In 1927, the Supreme Court upheld her conviction and the Act in Whitney v. California, using the "bad tendency" standard.
- Sacco and Vanzetti (imprisoned 1921–1927), both anarchists, were convicted and executed for murdering two people during an armed robbery. Historian Kathlyn Gay includes them in a list of "political prisoners" and quotes Massachusetts Governor Michael Dukakis as saying "their trial and appeals were permeated by prejudice against foreigners and hostility toward unorthodox political views".
- Angelo Herndon (imprisoned 1933–1937), an African-American labor organizer and member of the American Communist Party, was convicted of insurrection after leading a large peaceful demonstration of unemployed black and white workers in Atlanta. The day after the demonstration, Angelo was arrested and was found in possession of communist publications. Fulton County Prosecutor John Hudson charged Angelo with "inciting an insurrection" under an 1861 slave statue that made the possession or distribution of seditious literature punishable by death. Hudson proclaimed that Herndon's trial was also a trial "of Lenin, Stalin, Trotsky and Kerensky, and every white person who believes that black and white should unite for the purpose of setting-up a Nigger Soviet Republic in the Black Belt". An all white jury found Angelo guilty and was sentenced to 18–20 years. Angelo won an appeal and was released on bail in December 1934. The Georgia Supreme Court later upheld the original conviction and he had to return to prison in October 1935. In April 1937, the U.S. Supreme Court heard the case and ruled in favor of Angelo in a 5–4 decision, striking down the Georgia insurrection for violation of the First Amendment.
- Julius and Ethel Rosenberg (imprisoned 1951–1953), spies for the Soviet Union, were the first Americans to be executed for espionage. Gay includes them in a list of political prisoners, in part because of their excessive sentence: "No other convicted spy — not even Rudolph Abel, the Soviet Union's chief spymaster in the United States — was executed by the United States during the entire Cold War".

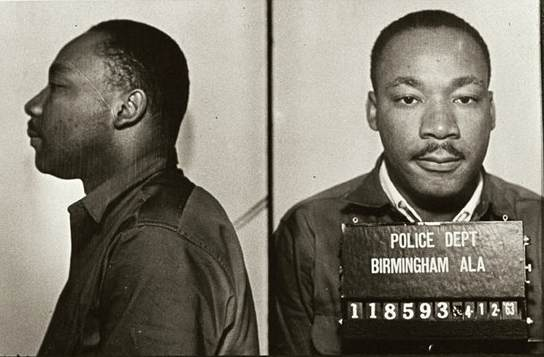
King was arrested in 1963 for protesting the treatment of black people in Birmingham.

- Martin Luther King Jr., a civil rights activist, was never imprisoned for an extended period of time, but he was arrested 29 times between 1956 and 1964. He is often named as a prisoner of conscience for his nonviolent opposition to racial segregation in the United States.
- Rosa Parks (arrested 1956), a civil rights activist, is commonly named as a prisoner of conscience for her civil disobedience to Montgomery bus segregation. In the 1970s, Parks organized for the freedom of political prisoners in the United States, particularly cases involving issues of self-defense. She helped found the Detroit chapter of the Joanne Little Defense Committee, supported other prisoner's defense committees, and supported the Wilmington Ten, RNA 11, and Gary Tyler. When Angela Davis was acquitted, Parks introduced her to an audience of 12,000 as a "dear sister who has suffered so much persecution".

== Prisoners highlighted by Amnesty International ==
Amnesty International is an INGO founded to oppose violations of human rights. Amnesty International has named the following people and groups as prisoners of conscience or political prisoners in the United States:

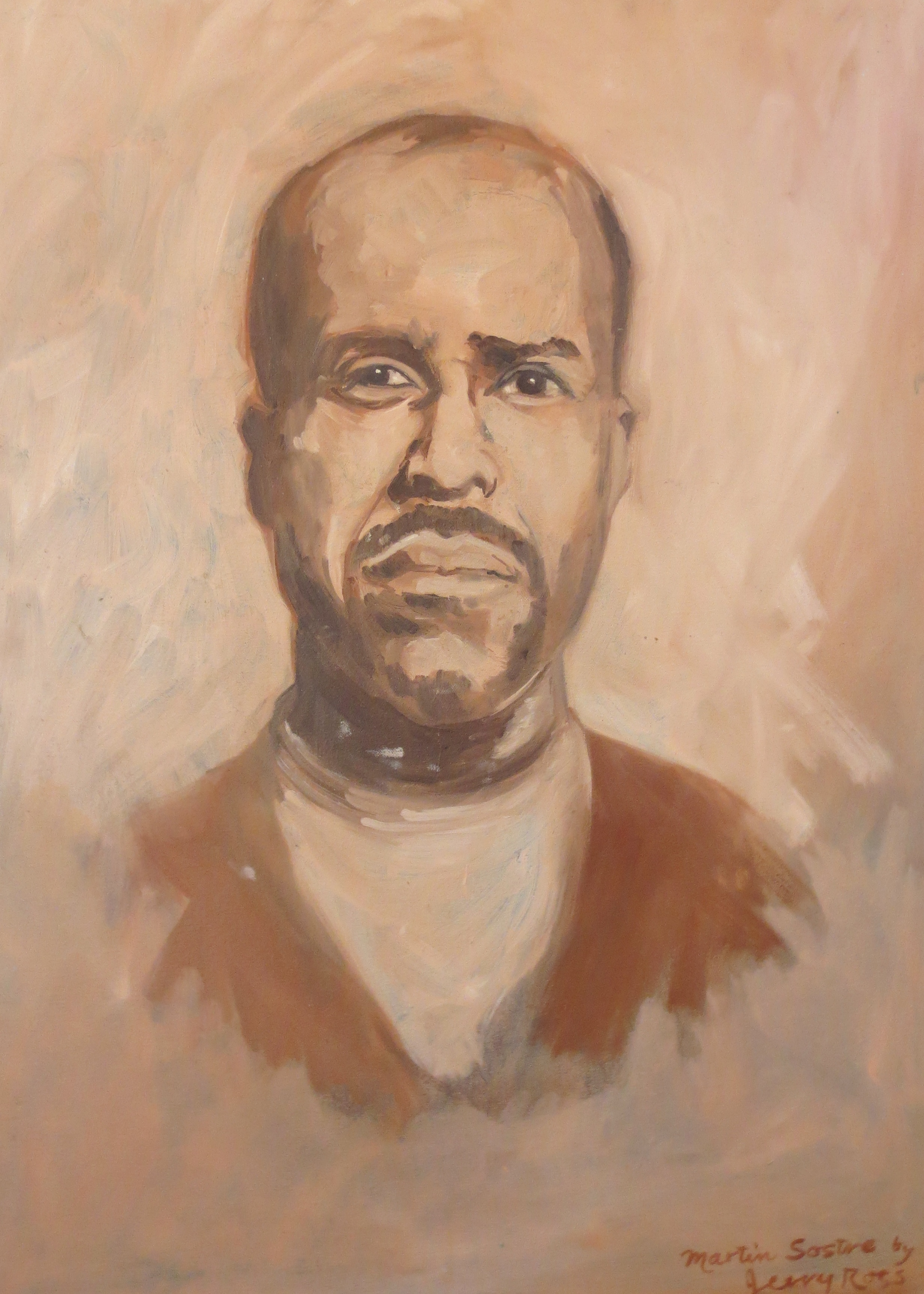
Painting of Martin Sostre by Jerry Ross

- Martin Sostre (imprisoned 1967–1976) was arrested at his bookstore for "narcotics, riot, arson, and assault", later proven to be fabricated as part of COINTELPRO. Amnesty International wrote that Sostre "was falsely implicated because of his political activities". Sostre's bookstore promoted Black nationalism, internationalism, and anarchism.
- Imari Obadele (imprisoned 1973–1978), as part of the RNA 11, was convicted of conspiracy to assault a federal agent. Amnesty International wrote that it "appears that the real reason for Mr Obadele's imprisonment is his political activity as leader of a black independence movement".
- The Wilmington Ten (Note: Full list: Benjamin Chavis, Connie Tindall, Marvin Patrick, Wayne Moore, Reginald Epps, Jerry Jacobs, James McKoy, Willie Earl Vereen, William Wright, Jr., Ann Shepard.) (imprisoned 1976–1980) were convicted of arson and conspiracy for the firebombing of a white-owned business. Amnesty International adopted the Ten because they were "denied a fair trial", because "their prosecutions were politically motivated and that their convictions were the result of false testimony".
- Charlotte Three (Note: Full list: Thomas James Reddy, James Grant, and Charles Parker) (imprisoned 1977–1979) were convicted of arson of a white-owned business. Amnesty International adopted the Three for the same reasons as the Wilmington Ten.
- US military conscientious objectors to the Gulf War: By September 1991, Amnesty International had adopted 25 prisoners of conscience who conscientiously objected to the Gulf War. In their 1995 report, Amnesty gave the full number as 30 prisoners of conscience. In particular, Amnesty International named George Morse (imprisoned 1991–1992) and Yolanda Huet-Vaughn (imprisoned 1991–1992).

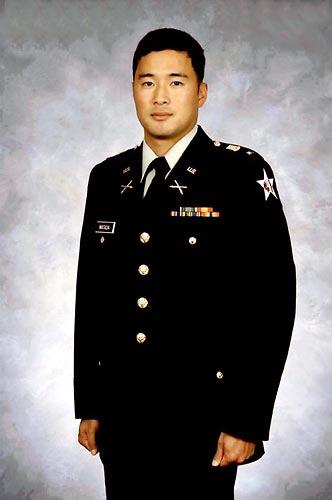
Ehren Watada in uniform, before his OTH discharge for refusing to deploy to Operation Iraqi Freedom

Amnesty International has identified multiple American conscientious objectors to the Iraq War who have either been imprisoned or are seeking refuge, notably in Canada, for their resistance. These individuals include:

- Camilo Mejía (imprisoned 2004–2005)
- Abdullah William Webster (imprisoned 2004–2005)
- Kevin Benderman (imprisoned 2005–2006)
- Mark Wilkerson (imprisoned 2007)
- Agustin Aguayo (imprisoned 2007)
- Victor Agosto (imprisoned 2009)
- Travis Bishop (imprisoned 2009)
- Kimberly Rivera (imprisoned 2012–2013)
- Jeremy Hinzman (seeking refuge in Canada)
- Matthew Lowell (seeking refuge in Canada)
- James Corey Glass (seeking refuge in Canada)
- Dean Walcott (seeking refuge in Canada)
- Ehren Watada (OTH discharged)

Amnesty International has highlighted the following people and groups as recipients of extensive inhumane treatment and/or wrongful or "framed" convictions, who may be considered political prisoners:

- Geronimo Ji-Jaga Pratt (imprisoned 1972–1997), a prominent member of the Black Panther Party, was convicted of murder (now vacated). In 1995, Amnesty International argued that evidence came to light after the trial that "Pratt had been targeted for 'neutralization' by COINTELPRO and suggested there had been misconduct by the FBI and state police in the prosecution of the case".
- The Angola Three (Note: (Robert Hillary King (imprisoned 1972–2001), Herman Wallace (imprisoned 1972–2013), Albert Woodfox (imprisoned 1972–2016)) were convicted of robbery and/or bank robbery, sent to Angola prison. While in prison, the Angola Three became prominent Black Panther Party members. They were later convicted of prison murders and faced near-continuous solitary confinement for decades, in the "longest period of solitary confinement in American prison history".
- Mumia Abu-Jamal (imprisoned 1981–present): Though Amnesty International concluded that his conviction proceedings violated the "minimum international standards that govern fair trial procedures and the use of the death penalty", but they did not describe Abu-Jamal as a political prisoner. In August 1999, when Abu-Jamal began giving radio commentary live on Pacifica Network's Democracy Now! radio news, prison staff severed the connecting wires of his telephone in mid-performance. The World Socialist Web Site described Abu-Jamal as a "political prisoner".
- Gary Tyler (imprisoned 1975–2016) was convicted of first-degree murder as a sixteen-year old, despite no physical evidence. In 1994, Amnesty International highlighted several major inconsistencies in the police investigation and ineffective assistance of counsel. In 2007, Amnesty International said Tyler's trial was "fundamentally unfair".
- Food Not Bombs: Amnesty International never formally named Keith McHenry or Robert Kahn as prisoners of conscience. However, in 1994, AI noted that "the law may have been used to harass and arrest these individuals because their activities" of "distributing free food to poor and homeless people and disseminating literature" are "unpopular with the City administration". In 1996, AI suggested that Kahn "may be a prisoner of conscience".
- Mazen Al-Najjar (imprisoned 1997–2000), on the basis of secret evidence, was detained indefinitely on suspicions of links to Palestinian terrorist groups. If Al-Najjar was "being held purely for his non-violent political sympathies and background, then he would be considered a prisoner of conscience".

== Prisoners considered by the Working Group on Arbitrary Detention ==
The Working Group on Arbitrary Detention (WAGD) is a United Nations body which examines alleged cases of arbitrary imprisonment. Arbitrary imprisonment is substantially broader than political imprisonment, as it also includes all cases where non-arbitrary legal processes failed for non-political reasons. The WAGD has considered the detention of the following individuals to be arbitrary on multiple categories:

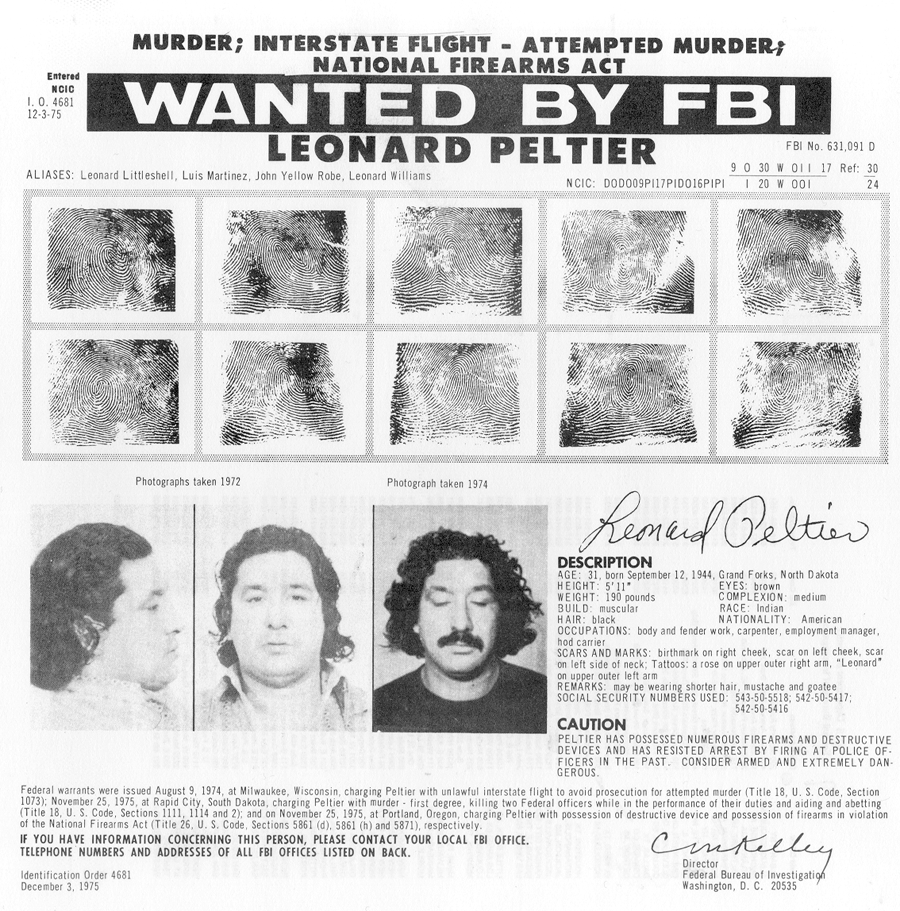
FBI wanted poster for Leonard Peltier

- Leonard Peltier (imprisoned 1977–2025) was convicted on two counts of murder of FBI agents during a shootout on Pine Ridge Indian Reservation. Amnesty International explicitly does not call Peltier a prisoner of conscience, but "believes that political factors may have influenced the way in which the case was prosecuted". In 2005, the WAGD found that the "deprivation of Mr. Leonard Peltier is not arbitrary", but in 2022 reversed that decision and found that Peltier's imprisonment was arbitrary on Category III (unfair trial) and Category V (discrimination) grounds. Peltier was a prominent member of the American Indian Movement.
- Marcos Antonio Aguilar-Rodríguez (imprisoned 2011–2017) fled El Salvador to the United States in 2001, where he sought asylum. He was arrested for speeding, but was ultimately placed in custody of ICE, who sought to deport him. The WAGD found that Aguilar-Rodríguez's imprisonment was arbitrary on Category II (human rights), Category IV (prolonged custody of migrants), and Category V (discrimination).
- Fernando Aguirre-Urbina (imprisoned 2012–2019) was brought to the United States as an undocumented minor at age 3. He pled guilty to intent to distribute meth and marijuana, served 8 months, and was released to ICE detention for 7 years. The WAGD found that Aguirre-Urbina's detention was arbitrary under all five categories.

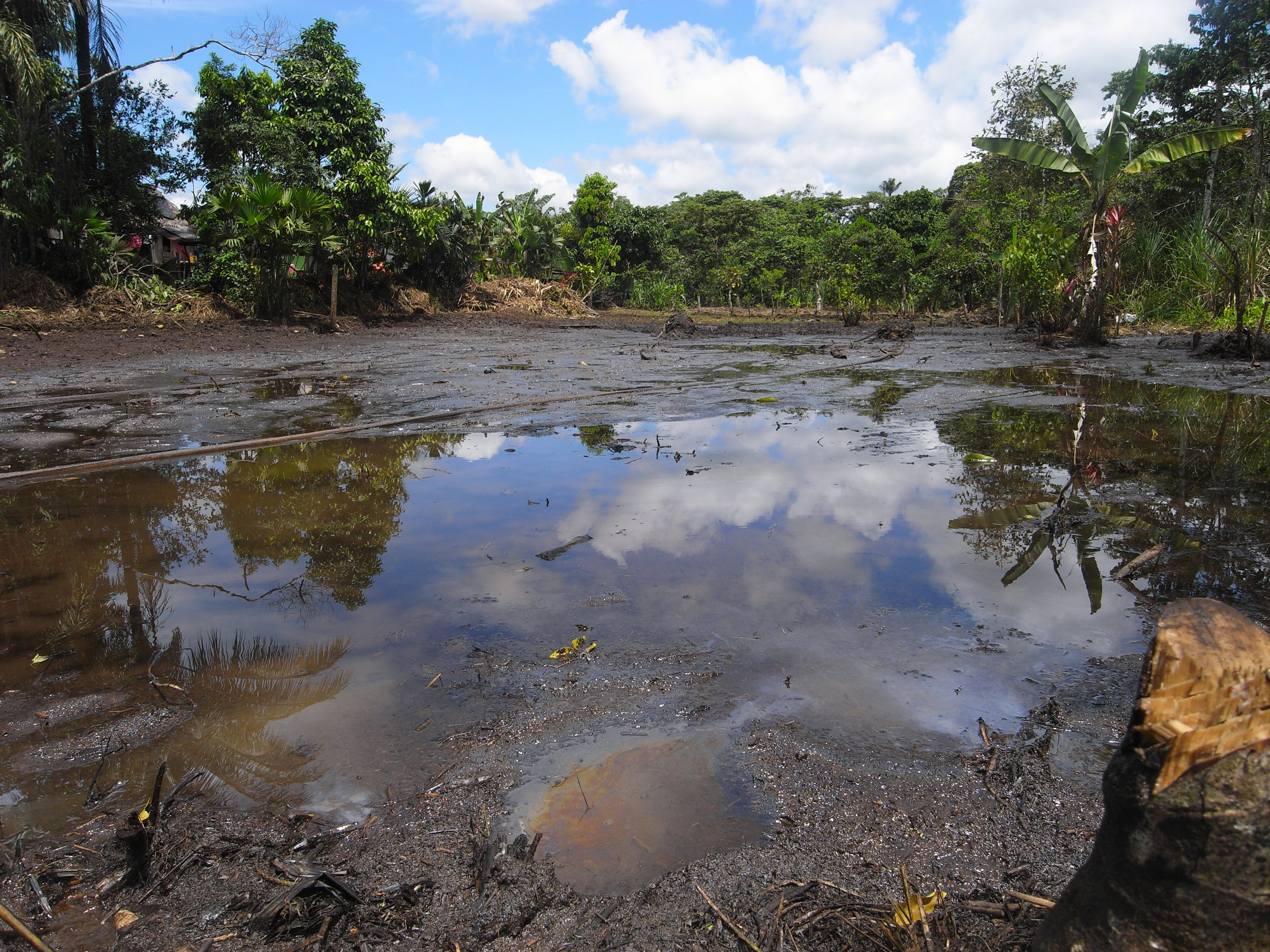
Oil pollution in Lago Agrio, November 2007, which Donziger described in 1993 as "what honestly looked like an apocalyptic disaster"

- Steven Donziger (imprisoned 2019–2022): Donziger, who had pursued a series of legal cases against Chevron Corporation, was placed under house arrest for contempt of court. The WAGD found that Donziger's house arrest was arbitrary on Category I (no legal basis), Category III (unfair trial), and Category V (discrimination).
- The Cuban Five (Note: Full list: Antonio Guerrero Rodriguez, Fernando González Llort, Gerardo Hernández Nordelo, Ramón Labanino Salazar, René González Sehwerert) (imprisoned 2001–2014) were convicted of espionage on Cuban-American groups for the government of Cuba. The WAGD found that their imprisonment was arbitrary on Category III (unfair trial), due to extended solitary confinement (17 months), limited access to evidence (under CIPA), and biased jury selection (anti-Cuban-government sentiment in Miami).
- Benamar Benatta (imprisoned 2001–2006) is a refugee from Algeria whose status was revoked soon after the September 11 attacks. Despite having been cleared of suspicions of terrorist activities by the FBI, Benatta was held in detention for nearly five years. The WAGD said that Benatta's treatment "could be described as torture" and found that his detention was arbitrary on Category I (no legal basis) and Category III (unfair trial).
- Humberto Álvarez Machaín (imprisoned 1990–1992) was accused of participating in the drug cartel-linked torture of Kiki Camarena and abducted to the United States. Alvarez Machaín was acquitted in 1992. The WAGD found that Alvarez Machaín's imprisonment was arbitrary on Category I (no legal basis). Álvarez Machaín's abduction eventually led to the 1992 Supreme Court decision United States v. Alvarez-Machain.

== Later notable alleged political prisoners ==
Because the term "political prisoner" is vague, there is disagreement on who should be included by that term. The people below prominently described themselves (or were described by other prominent people) as political prisoners:

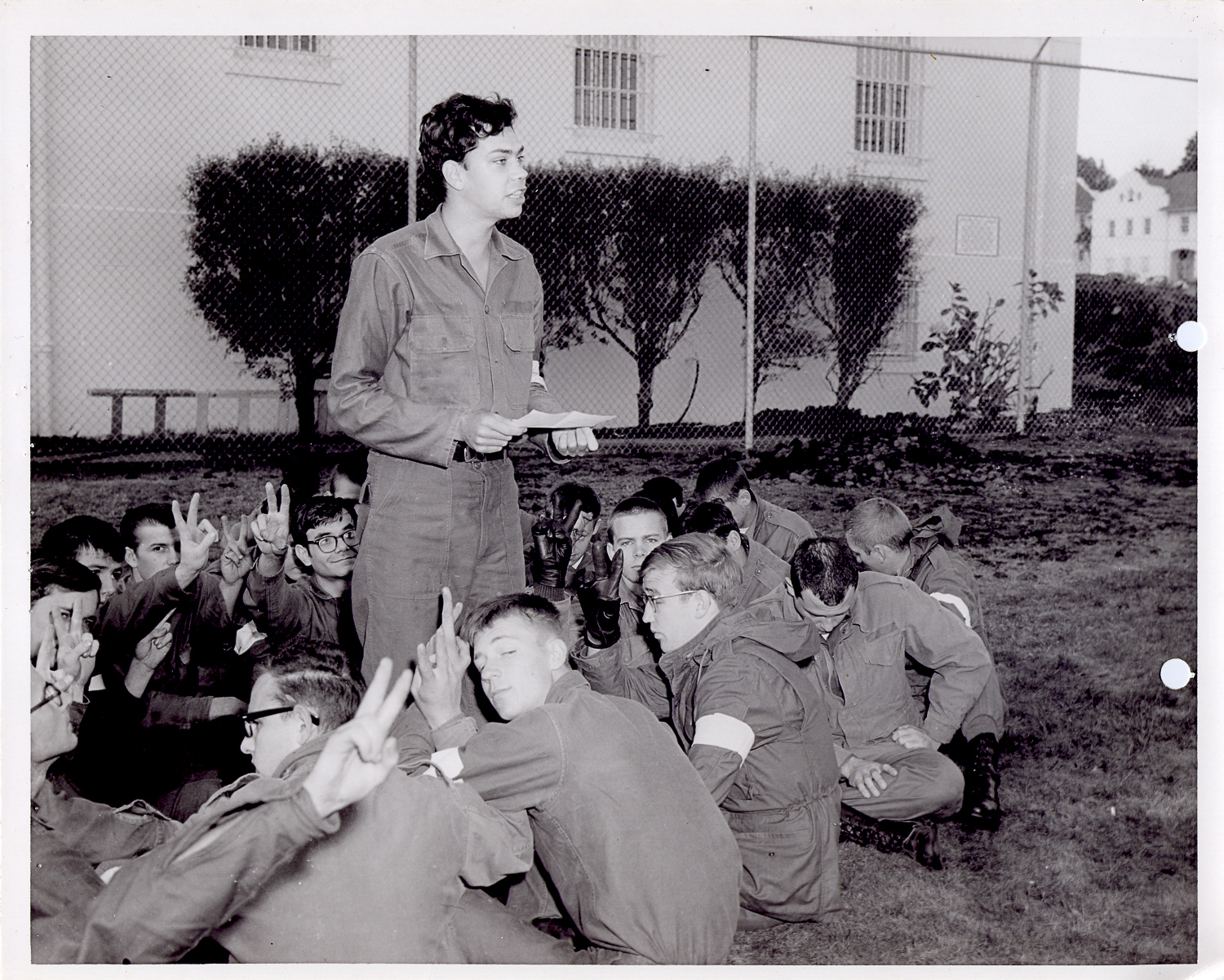
27 soldiers at Presidio stockades "mutiny" in sit-down protest to protest the murder of one of their own

- Presidio 27 (mostly imprisoned 1968–1970), conscripted soldiers during the Vietnam War, were convicted of mutiny for their sit-down protest after the killing of another stockade prisoner by military police. In 1968, three prisoners fled to Canada. One, Keith Mather, was caught and imprisoned from 1980 to 1985. His lawyer called him "the last prisoner of conscience from the Vietnam War".
- Fred Hampton (imprisoned 1969), a local chairman of the Black Panther Party, was convicted of assaulting a Good Humor ice cream van driver, stealing $71 worth of ice cream bars, and giving them to kids on the street. In a memoir, Frank B. Wilderson III places this incident in the context of COINTELPRO efforts to disrupt the Black Panthers of Chicago by the "leveling of trumped-up charges". In 1969, Hampton was killed in his sleep by Cook County police officers. Civil rights activists Roy Wilkins and Ramsey Clark, styled as "The Commission of Inquiry into the Black Panthers and the Police", alleged that the Chicago police had killed Hampton without justification or provocation and had violated the Panthers' constitutional rights against unreasonable search and seizure. "The Commission" further alleged that the Chicago Police Department had imposed a summary punishment on the Panthers.
- Angela Davis (imprisoned 1970–1972): Davis, a Marxist and activist, assisted the Soledad brothers, three inmates who were accused of killing a prison guard at Soledad Prison, in purchasing several of the firearms they would use in the attack, and was found to have been corresponding with one of the inmates involved. Since California considers "all persons concerned in the commission of a crime, ... whether they directly commit the act constituting the offense, or aid and abet in its commission, ... are principals in any crime so committed", Davis was charged with "aggravated kidnapping and first degree murder in the death of Judge Harold Haley", and Marin County Superior Court Judge Peter Allen Smith issued a warrant for her arrest. On August 18, four days after the warrant was issued, the FBI director J. Edgar Hoover listed Davis on the FBI's Ten Most Wanted Fugitive List. Soon after, Davis became a fugitive and fled California, but FBI Agents found her on October 13, 1970.
- Assata Shakur (imprisoned 1974–1979), a member of the Black Liberation Army, was convicted of murder after a 1973 shootout with police. Angela Davis called Shakur a "political prisoner" in 1973, arguing that the trial was unfair. A panel of jurists, invited by Shakur's defense lawyer, inspected Shakur's conditions, of solitary confinement for 21 months, and concluded that her conditions were inhumane, and that Shakur had been a victim of COINTELPRO. In contrast, Amnesty International did not regard Shakur as a political prisoner. In 1979, members of BLA and the May 19th Communist Organization helped Shakur escape from prison. Shakur later escaped to Cuba, where she remained until her death.
- Richard Wershe Jr. (imprisoned 1987–2021) was an FBI informant who was convicted of possession of over 650 grams of cocaine. The film White Boy describes Wershe as a "political prisoner" who received harsh sentences for informing on several Detroit representatives.
- Lyndon LaRouche (imprisoned 1988–1994): LaRouche was convicted of conspiracy to commit mail fraud. LaRouche's attorney called the conviction politically motivated, while the judge in question said the idea that LaRouche's organization was a sufficient threat to warrant this "just defies human experience." The LaRouche movement, which mixes far-left and far-right rhetoric, and which The New York Times calls "cult-like", has claimed that LaRouche is a political prisoner and appealed to the United Nations Commission on Human Rights for relief; the WAGD did not consider his case.

Chelsea Manning said she gave WikiLeaks video of the "Collateral Murder" July 12, 2007, Baghdad airstrike in early 2010.

- Fred Hampton Jr. (imprisoned 1991–2001), son of Fred Hampton, was convicted of aggravated arson during the 1992 Los Angeles riots, a six-day period of protests and outrage in response to the acquittal of four LAPD officers who were charged with excessive force in the beating of Rodney King during an arrest.
- John Kiriakou (imprisoned 2013–2015), a CIA officer, was the first US government official to confirm the use of waterboarding at CIA black sites. Kiriakou was convicted of leaking classified information about the identity of undercover agents to journalists, often described as a political conviction for Kiriakou's whistleblowing.
- Chelsea Manning (imprisoned 2010–2017) was convicted of leaking classified information on US military activities to WikiLeaks.
- Edward Snowden (charged in 2013, never imprisoned) was charged on June 14, 2013, for leaking highly classified information from the National Security Agency (NSA), which showed that NSA had a global & domestic spy network.
- Paul Manafort (imprisoned 2019–2020) describes himself as a "political prisoner" for his conviction in the Mueller special counsel investigation.
- People sentenced to prison for alleged involvement with the January 6 United States Capitol attack have been called political prisoners by InfoWars and Tucker Carlson, as well as several Republican members of Congress. Citing poor conditions, 34 prisoners published a letter that requested a transfer to Guantanamo Bay in which 7 signers called themselves "political prisoners".
  - Enrique Tarrio, chairman of the Proud Boys neo-fascist militant organization, was sentenced on September 5, 2023, to 22 years in prison for seditious conspiracy. Tarrio created the Proud Boys' "Ministry of Self Defense", which coordinated attacks on January 6 Capitol attack and celebrated them afterward, with Tarrio writing: "Make no mistake. We did this." Congresspeople including Matt Gaetz, Marjorie Taylor Greene and Louie Gohmert have argued that Tarrio is a political prisoner. On January 20, 2025, Tarrio was pardoned by President Trump. Tarrio said he wanted "retribution" against those responsible for his incarceration.
- Stop Cop City (charged 2023): In March 2023, Amnesty International co-signed a letter which said that "application of the domestic terrorism statute" against 19 of the 35 arrested March 2023 protestors "is an escalatory intimidation tactic and a draconian step that seems intended to chill First Amendment protected activity".
- Mahmoud Khalil (arrested 2025), a pro-Palestine activist studying at Columbia University, was detained at his home by Immigration and Customs Enforcement (ICE) agents on March 8, 2024. Khalil self-identified as a Palestinian political prisoner in a letter dictated from ICE detention and fourteen US Congresspeople signed a letter calling him a political prisoner, including Rashida Tlaib, Ilhan Omar, Summer Lee, and Delia Ramirez.

== See also ==
- Political violence in the United States
- Prisoners' rights and the Prisoners Rights Union
- MKUltra, COINTELPRO, and the Church Committee
- Political abuse of psychiatry, including 5150 (involuntary psychiatric hold)
- Communications Management Unit (CMU)
- Prison abolition movement and Anarchist Black Cross
- Rasul v. Bush and the Center for Constitutional Rights
- National Lawyers Guild
- International Labor Defense and National Committee for the Defense of Political Prisoners
- Partisan Defense Committee
- Prison Radio
- 1970 Folsom Prison strike and Attica Prison riot
- Political Repression in Modern America
