= War Resisters Support Campaign =

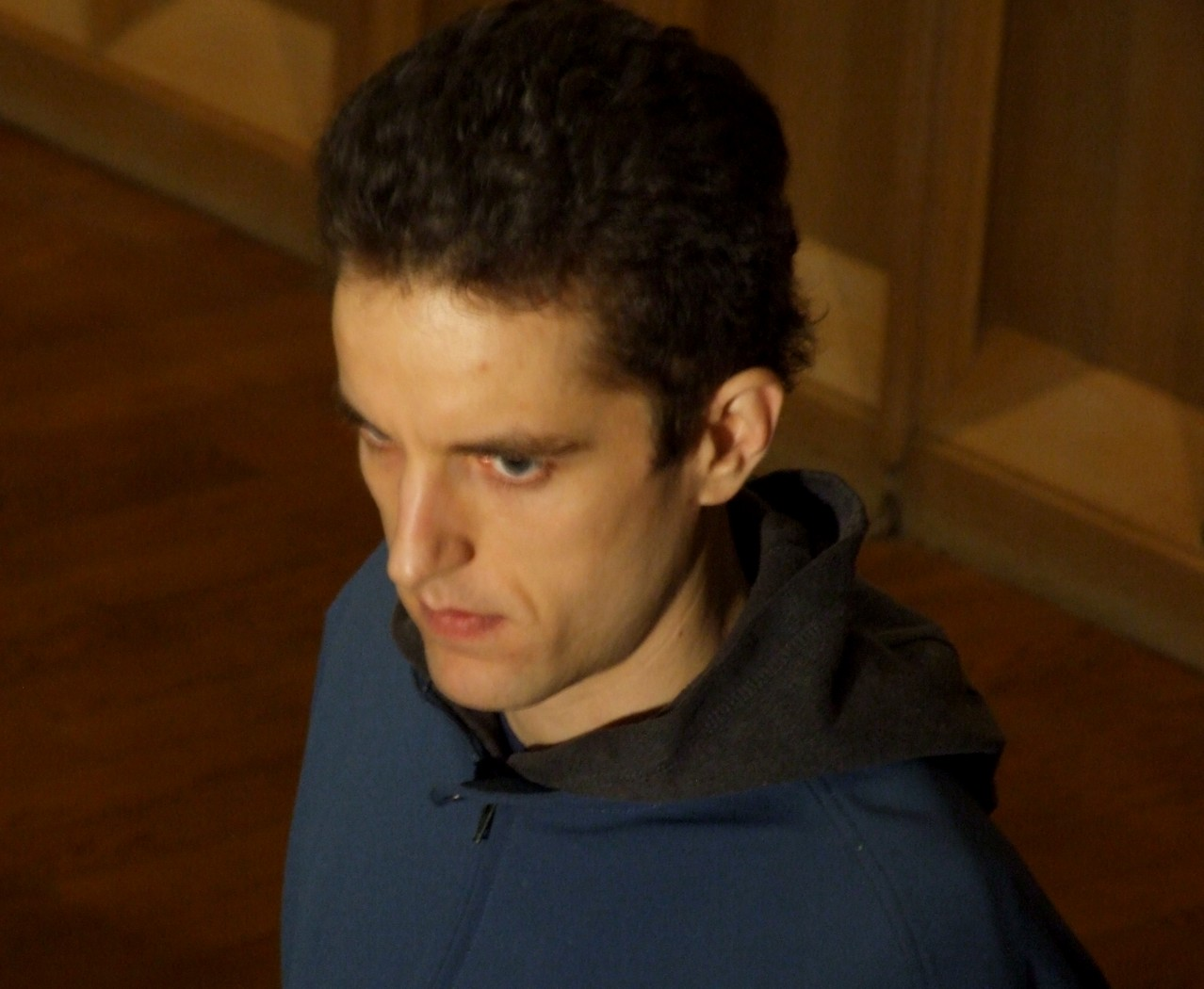
Jeremy Hinzman at a 2008 speaking engagement.

The War Resisters Support Campaign (WRSC) is a Canadian non-profit community organization, founded in April 2004 in Toronto, Ontario to mobilize support among Canadians and worldwide to convince the Canadian government to offer sanctuary to all U.S. military personnel who wish to come to Canada because of their opposition to the invasion and occupation of Iraq.

== Overview ==
The Campaign, headquartered in Toronto, has chapters in Ottawa, Ont.; Vancouver, BC.; Victoria, BC.; Nelson, BC.; Sudbury, Ont.; London, Ontario, and Thunder Bay, Ont. As well, there are supporters in almost every part of Canada, as well as many in the United States and elsewhere.

As of August 2007, the campaign had attracted support from trade unions, including the Canadian Labour Congress, the United Steelworkers, the International Association of Machinists (Ontario); the Canadian Auto Workers; and many others. A very diverse support network of Faith groups have also been supportive of this campaign – ranging from the Society of Friends (Quakers) to KAIROS (a joint project of many churches in Canada) to the York Region Islamic Centre and many others. Prominent individuals have also offered support, among them Shirley Douglas, Naomi Klein, Avi Lewis, Sarah Harmer, Susan Sarandon, and Tom Hayden. The New Democratic Party of Canada, is a major supporter as well, in particular the party leader Jack Layton and MPs Bill Siksay, Joe Comartin and Jean Crowder. A number of Liberal MPs have also expressed support. They include Bonnie Brown, Mario Silva, Borys Wrzesnewskij, Stephen Owen, and others. The Campaign has conducted an active lobbying effort to find and generate support among Liberals, and will soon expand that effort to reach out to MPs from the Bloc Québécois.

The Campaign's funds come from donations and from the proceeds of fundraising events. Important recent events were held in Buffalo, N.Y.and in Ft. Erie Ont. "Peace Has No Borders" and at Peace Arch Park, BC.as well as in Ottawa, Ont.; Nelson BC., and many other locations. Prior to those, a major event took place on December 10, 2005 in Toronto attended by over 300 people, featuring the premiere showing of the Campaign video "Let Them Stay: Voices of US War Resisters in Canada" and a performance by the Common Threads Chorus. The Campaign continues to sponsor events and to raise funds via its website www.resisters.ca and through other outreach.

The Campaign offers practical support to US war resisters in Canada, including temporary housing, funds for everyday expenses when needed, access to legal advice and representation, and many other less formal supports. Potential war resisters who contact the Campaign while in the US are asked first to contact the GI Rights Hotline at 877 447 4487 or girightshotline.org to obtain information on options that they may have in the US. This is because the Campaign is well aware that a decision to come to Canada is a serious one, and must be carefully considered.

== The War Resisters in Canada ==
There are currently between 30 and 40 US war resisters in Canada, including some families. These war resisters have made contact with the Campaign and are applying for refugee status in Canada, as well as receiving various forms of support, as needed – and as far as Campaign resources permit. There are other US war resisters in Canada, but how many there might be is a subject for speculation. The best estimate is probably between 100 and 200. The Campaign recommends that people NOT stay in Canada without status, as this is contrary to Canadian immigration law.

The war resisters mostly go to Toronto, Ontario; or Vancouver, British Columbia when they first arrive in Canada, because that is where the majority of the campaign organizing takes place. However an increasing number have been going to Nelson, BC. where there is a growing Campaign, and others have settled in various locations across the country. Recently chapters in London and Ottawa, Ont. have welcomed their first war resisters.

Applicants for refugee status in Canada are entitled to a work permit and to Canada's universal health care while they wait for their claim to be decided. Claims can take several years to decide.

A major part of a refugee claim is the refugee hearing, which takes place before a member of Immigration and Refugee Board of Canada (IRB). It is essential to have legal advice and representation at the hearing, and the Campaign has several lawyers who work with the war resisters. Once the hearing has taken place, the IRB will issue a decision (after several months), either granting or rejecting the claim. If the claim is granted, the individual or family is permitted to remain in Canada, eventually moving on to Permanent Resident status and, if the person wishes, to Canadian citizenship.

== Important Dates ==
On Dec. 6, 2007, the Canadian Standing Committee on Citizenship and Immigration adopted the following motion:

The Committee recommends that the government immediately implement a program to allow conscientious objectors and their immediate family members (partners and dependents), who have refused or left military service related to a war not sanctioned by the United Nations and do not have a criminal record, to apply for permanent resident status and remain in Canada; and that the government should immediately cease any removal or deportation actions that may have already commenced against such individuals.

On June 3, 2008, the Parliament of Canada voted 137 to 110 in favor of the above recommendation to the government (see list of names: ). However, the next day, the Toronto Star printed the following:

"But the motion is non-binding and the victory was bittersweet as the government is likely to ignore it.

"We're worried that (Prime Minister Stephen) Harper might not follow the advice of a majority of the members of the House of Commons who voted today," NDP Leader Jack Layton told reporters yesterday.

"He has had a tendency to turn his back on the message of peace that so many Canadians would want to bring forward and the welcome that they would want to offer to those who have expressed this particular courage."

The motion – which passed 137–110 – comes about a week before 25-year-old Corey Glass is supposed to leave Canada voluntarily after the former national guardsman was rejected as a refugee and ordered out of the country.

On July 4, 2008, US Iraq war resister Joshua Key won a Federal Court (Canada) appeal thus forcing the Canadian Refugee Board to re-examine his claim for refugee status in Canada. The Canadian Broadcasting Corporation's July 4, 2008 coverage of the story said that there is now a possibility that he "could qualify as a refugee."

On July 9, 2008 the Toronto Star reported that Corey Glass "is [now] permitted to remain in Canada until the Federal Court makes a decision on ... cases for judicial review."

On July 16, 2008, the Toronto Star reported that Robin Long "was ordered out of the country last week...He was deported yesterday"

On Feb 12, 2009, the Standing Committee on Citizenship and Immigration again passed a non-binding motion reaffirming Parliament's June 2008 vote which recommended that the government let Iraq War resisters stay in Canada. (Because a new session of Parliament began, the whole process had to begin again.) A month and a half later, on March 30, 2009, the House of Commons again voted in a non-binding motion 129 to 125 in favour of the committee's recommendation.

== Punishments given to Iraq War Resisters ==
War Resister	Country	Date Convicted	Convicted of	Sentence	Actual Prison Time
Stephen Funk	United States	Sept. 6, 2003	"Unauthorized Absence"	6 months	6 months
Camilo Mejia	United States	May 21, 2004	"Desertion"	12 months	9 months
Abdullah William Webster ( Amnesty International "Prisoner of Conscience" )	United States	June 3, 2004	"failing to obey commands from superior and missing brigade's movements"	14 months	11 months
Kevin Benderman	United States	July 2005	"Missing Movement by Design," "Desertion with Intent to Avoid Hazardous Duty"	15 months	13 months
Malcolm Kendall-Smith	UK	April 13, 2006	"Refusal to obey a legal order"	8 months plus fine, etc.	2 months plus other penalties
Agustin Aguayo ( Amnesty International "Prisoner of Conscience")	United States	March 6, 2007	"Desertion"		7 months
Ryan Jackson	United States	May 30, 2008	"Desertion"	100 days	
***James Burmeister (Returned to the US without being given a deportation order.)	United States	July 16, 2008	"Desertion"	9 months	3 months and 10 days
***Robin Long (subscription required) (Applied for legal status, but was given a deportation order)	United States	Aug 22, 2008	"Desertion with the intent to stay away permanently"	15 months	12 months
Tony Anderson	United States	Nov 17, 2008	"Desertion"	14 months	
***Daniel Sandate (imprisonment began July 16, 2008; ended January 20, 2009) (Did not apply for legal status; was deported)	United States	Nov 17, 2008	"Desertion"	8 months	6 months
***Clifford Cornell (Applied for legal status, but was given a deportation order)	US	April 29, 2009	"Desertion"	one year, later reduced to 11 months	11 months (Released Jan 16, 2010)

"***" – Was in Canada as an Iraq war resister

== Resisters Who Went Back ==
Several war resisters have returned to the US, with mixed results. Darrell Anderson turned himself in at Ft. Knox, Ky. in October 2006. He got an Other Than Honorable Discharge after a few days and is now living in his hometown nearby.

But when Kyle Snyder also turned himself in at Ft. Knox, he was not discharged. Instead, he was ordered to report to his unit in Ft Leonard Wood, Mo. He decided to go AWOL, and in November 2006 he started to speak publicly about his opposition to the war and demanding to be discharged without penalty in the US.

Ivan Brobeck also returned to the US. A Marine, he was taken to Quantico Marine Base, Va., where he was Court Martialed for UA and Missing Movement. Brobeck was sentenced to 8 months incarceration, reduction in rank, reduction in pay grade. Due to a pre-trial agreement Brobeck served 63 days of his sentence and was released on Feb 6, 2007.

James Burmeister also returned to the US. On July 16, 2008, he was sentenced to 9 months in jail for desertion.

The War Resisters Support Campaign did not recommend that these war resisters return to the US.

== See also ==
- Canada and Iraq War resisters
- List of Iraq War resisters
- List of anti-war organizations
- The Right to Refuse to Kill
- Canada and the Vietnam War, early war resisters since 1965
