= War resister =

Person who resists war

A war resister is a person who resists war. The term can mean several things: resisting participation in all war, or a specific war, either before or after enlisting in, being inducted into, or being conscripted into a military force.

== History, evolution and etymology of the term ==
Early usage of the term "war resister" is found in the name of the War Resisters League which was formed in 1923 by men and women who had opposed World War I. The War Resisters League is a section of the London-based War Resisters' International which was founded in Bilthoven, Netherlands, in 1921 under the name "Paco".

In 1975, the Committee on South African War Resistance, an organisation of exiled conscientious objectors, pacifists, anti-militarists and deserters from the South African Defence Force (SADF), was formed in the aftermath of Operation Savannah and the Soweto uprising the following year. Its aim was to raise international awareness about the role of the SADF and to provide support to objectors in exile.

In 2008 and 2009, the Parliament of Canada officially adopted the term "war resister" to include those who are not necessarily opposed to all war, but who selectively refused to participate in the Iraq War. This practice was also adopted by various media in Canada at various times.

On January 24, 2010, the term "War Resisters" was the name of a nine-minute documentary on Global Television Network television program 16:9. Carolyn Jarvis interviewed war resisters Robin Long and Rodney Watson, and Canadian Member of Parliament Gerard Kennedy on his Bill C-440 regarding Iraq war resisters in Canada.

On November 9, 2010, Canadian writer Peter Smollett referred to people opposing World War I as "war resisters." Among the people he mentioned were Albert Goodwin and Siegfried Sassoon.

== Terminology and semantics of the term ==
War resisters have been referred to using various related terms: "deserter", "conscientious objector", or "refugee". However, it is important to recognize that each of those terms has a very specific meaning in legal English, whereas each of those terms carries a broader semantic meaning in Standard English.

=== Legal English ===
==== International law ====
In international law, specifically the Handbook on Procedures and Criteria for Determining Refugee Status of the Office of the United Nations High Commissioner for Refugees (UNHCR), there is discussion of "refugee status after desertion" as being legitimate under international law. The Handbook states:

171. Not every conviction, genuine though it may be, will constitute a sufficient reason for claiming refugee status after desertion or draft-evasion. It is not enough for a person to be in disagreement with his government regarding the political justification for a particular military action. Where, however, the type of military action, with which an individual does not wish to be associated, is condemned by the international community as contrary to basic rules of human conduct, punishment for desertion or draft-evasion could, in the light of all other requirements of the definition, in itself be regarded as persecution.

==== Canadian law ====
The federal law-making body of Canada is the Parliament of Canada. The term "war resister" is used in the official documents of the Parliament of Canada: On November 22, 2007, a Canadian Parliamentary Committee "commenced its study of Iraq war resisters" This Committee work resulted in a motion which also used the term "war resisters" and which was passed twice by the House of Commons of Canada: on June 3, 2008, and on March 30, 2009. After the motion passed the first time, the media began to use the term "war resister," also.

There was some controversy when the Canadian Supreme Court refused to hear the appeals of two American army deserters, Jeremy Hinzman and Brandon Hughey, whose requests for refugee status were denied. Both had deserted to Canada in 2004 after learning they were to be deployed to Iraq. The high court, as usual, gave no reasons for its refusal.

Earlier the Federal Court and the Federal Court of Appeal upheld the Immigration and Refugee Board (IRB) findings that the two did not qualify as Convention refugees. Both faced court martial and up to five years in jail as deserters if returned. Lawyer Faisal Kutty argued that the IRB and the court appear to have danced around the politically sensitive issues and existing case law. Their arguments that they did not want to participate in an illegal war and that they would be punished for acting on their conscience was rejected by the IRB. The adjudicators held that they were not conscientious objectors (because they were not opposed to wars in general); the U.S. was willing and able to protect them; and that their treatment would not amount to persecution.

Paragraph 171 of UN Handbook on Procedures and Criteria for Determining Convention Refugee Status provides that where the type of military action with which an individual does not wish to be associated is condemned by the international legal community as contrary to rules of human conduct, punishment for desertion could be regarded as persecution.

In denying both claims, the adjudicators opined that the legal status of the war in Iraq had no bearing on the analysis of paragraph 171. This determination was one of the issues on which the matters were appealed to the Federal Court, but Justice Anne Mactavish, noted in separate decisions (Hughey v. Canada [2006] F.C. 421 and Hinzman v. Canada [2006] F.C. 420) that this question was not an issue before her and did not have to be decided.

The duo's lawyer, Jeffrey House, says the decisions at both levels were also based on the erroneous view that American jurisprudence gives war resisters the right to seek a remedy if they question the legality of a war. In fact, he argues that this is not true. The leading case on the "political questions doctrine" which revolves around whether people can challenge the legality of war based on their conscience and international law was turned down by the United States Supreme Court in Callan v. Bush. Given this situation, the U.S. is not in a position to provide protection to resisters, notes House. House himself was a war resister.

The existing case law from the Federal Court of Appeal, Al-Maisri v. Canada [1995] F.C. J. No. 642, appears on point and yet was rejected by Justice Mactavish as being of "limited assistance." The case involved a Yemeni who was denied status by the IRB. Al-Maisri acknowledged he was prepared to fight for Yemen to protect it from aggression, but was not prepared to fight for Iraq against Kuwait. Yemen was an Iraqi supporter. The Court of Appeal held that "non-defensive incursion into foreign territory" was within the ambit of paragraph 171 and overturned the IRB decision. "What is wrong for Saddam Hussein should be wrong for the Americans as well," says House, a Vietnam-era draft dodger.

Justice Mactavish held that the legality of the conflict is irrelevant when analyzing paragraph 171 when "one is considering the claim of a low-level 'foot soldier'." Yet, Al-Maisri was also a 'foot soldier.' Justice Mactavish admitted that "given the decision of the Court of Appeal in Al-Maisri, it is fair to say that the issue is not entirely free from doubt," and proceeded to certify this question, which gave the two an automatic right of appeal to the Court of Appeal.

Authorities in Canada and the U.S closely monitored the politically sensitive case. Indeed, the case became the proverbial public relations "hot potato" for the U.S. At the initial hearing, a former U.S. Marine testifying in Hinzman's support stated that American soldiers in Iraq routinely violated international law by killing unarmed civilians, including women and children. Affidavits from two international law professors confirming the illegality of the war and reports from Human Rights Watch and the International Committee of the Red Cross documenting the abuses and violations were also filed.

== See also ==
- Antimilitarism
- Canada and Iraq War resisters
- Committee on South African War Resistance
- Conscientious objector
- Copperhead (politics)
- Counter-recruitment
- Deserter
- Draft dodger
- List of anti-war organizations
- List of Iraq War resisters
- List of peace activists
- Non-aggression principle
- Peace movement
- Peace Pledge Union
- Plowshares movement
- Refusal to serve in the Israeli military
- South African resistance to war
- Tax resistance
- War Resisters International
- War Resisters League
- War Resisters League Peace Award
- War Resisters Support Campaign
