= Kimberly Rivera =

Iraq War resister

- Known for: 2007 desertion from military service
- Military career
- Born: 1981 or 1982 (age 44–45)
- Allegiance: United States of America
- Branch: U.S. Army
- Service years: 2006–07
- Rank: Private E-1 (No Insignia)(Demoted from PFC)
- Conflicts: Iraq War

Kimberly Rivera (born c. 1982) is an American Iraq War resister and former U.S. Army Private First Class who went AWOL in February 2007 after a year of service. She was the first female U.S. military deserter to flee to Canada. She was deported from Canada on September 20, 2012, and pleaded guilty to desertion, receiving a sentence of ten months' imprisonment and a bad-conduct discharge. Amnesty International objected to her detention and designated her a prisoner of conscience.

== Background and military service ==
A long-time resident of Mesquite, Texas, Rivera worked at Walmart prior to joining the army, meeting her future husband Mario there. After she and Mario married, they agreed that one of them should join the army for financial reasons, but both were initially too overweight for the army's requirements. Because Rivera shed the weight faster, she enlisted instead of her husband, signing with the U.S. Army in January 2006 for an $8,000 bonus.

She served her first tour of duty in Iraq starting in October of that year and worked primarily as a gate guard. She soon became disillusioned with the mission, later stating that she was particularly influenced by seeing a crying two-year-old Iraqi girl coming with her family to claim compensation for bombing by coalition forces. On another occasion, Rivera claims to have returned to her bunk to find a piece of shrapnel in it. Though she had been initially interested in supporting democracy for the Iraqi people, she stated that she felt she found only "lies" in Iraq and felt betrayed by the U.S. government.

== Flight to Canada ==
While on leave in early 2007, from which she was supposed to return to her deployed unit, she and her husband made contact with the Toronto-based War Resisters Support Campaign, and on February 18, 2007, fled across the border to Canada with their children. Rivera then applied for refugee status.

In January 2009, the Immigration and Refugee Board of Canada ruled that Rivera must leave the country by the end of the month. Immigration Minister Jason Kenney described Rivera and other U.S. military deserters as "bogus claimants" for refugee status, calling them "people who volunteer to serve in the armed forces of a democratic country and simply change their mind to desert. And that's fine, that's the decision they have made, but they are not refugees." MPs of the Liberal and NDP responded that their parties would refuse to deport military deserters if they assumed power, while Lee Zalofsky of the War Resisters Support Campaign stated that Kenney's remark showed the ministry as biased and unwilling to hear cases in a "fair and impartial manner". Rivera appealed the decision.

== Deportation, arrest and court-martial ==
In August 2012, five years after her arrival in Canada, Rivera received another deportation order, ordering her to return to the United States by September 20, 2012. Amnesty International stated that it considered Rivera a conscientious objector and would consider her a prisoner of conscience if she were detained. Upon her return to the U.S., she was arrested and transferred to military custody.

Subsequent to a plea agreement between Rivera and U.S. military authorities, a sentencing hearing was held April 29, 2013, at Fort Carson, Colorado. After pleading guilty, she was sentenced to ten months' imprisonment and given a bad-conduct discharge.

Rivera submitted a request to the convening authority requesting an early release from prison, so that she would be able to stay with her newborn son (born November 25, 2013, at Balboa Naval Medical Center). This request was rejected on November 27. Supporters of Rivera called for an "International Day of Action" on December 1, including demonstrations and vigils outside military installations and US consulates.

Two days after giving birth to her fifth child, Rivera was separated from the child and returned to prison from the hospital to serve the remainder of her sentence.

On 28 November her clemency request for a 45-day reduction of her 10-month sentence was denied by Fort Carson Senior Commander Brigadier General Michael A. Bills.

On 12 December 2013, Kimberly Rivera was released from the Miramar military confinement facility in San Diego, California on the grounds of good behavior and for the performance of extra work duties, including crocheting blankets for wounded veterans.

== Family ==
At the time of Rivera's deportation from Canada, Kimberly and Mario Rivera had four children. Their two eldest children were born in the U.S., and the two youngest in Canada.

Rivera's fifth child, Matthew Kaden, was born on November 25, 2013, while Rivera was in U.S. military confinement.

== See also ==
- Canada and Iraq War resisters
- Jeremy Hinzman
- Joshua Key
- List of Iraq War resisters
- Robin Long
