= Doe v. Bush =

- Court: United States Court of Appeals for the First Circuit
- Full case name: John Doe I, John Doe II, John Doe III, John Doe IV, Jane Doe I, Susan E. Schumann, Charles Richardson, Nancy Lessin, Jeffrey McKenzie, John Conyers, Dennis Kucinich, Jesse Jackson, Jr., Sheila Jackson lee, Jim McDermott, Jose E. Serrano, Sally Wright, Deborah Regal, Alice Copeland Brown, Jerrye Barre, James Stephen Cleghorn, Laura Johnson Manis, Shirley H. Young, Julian Delgaudio, Rose Delgaudio, Danny K. Davis, Maurice D. Hinchey, Carolyn Kilpatrick, Pete Stark, Diane Watson, Lynn C. Woolsey v. George W. Bush, President, Donald H. Rumsfeld, Secretary of Defense
- Decided: March 13, 2003
- Citation: 323 F.3d 133 (1st Cir. 2003)

Case history
- Prior actions: Doe v. Bush, 240 F. Supp. 2d 95 (D. Mass., 2003); Doe v. Bush, 257 F. Supp. 2d 436 (D. Mass., 2003)
- Subsequent actions: Rehearing denied by Doe v. Bush, 322 F.3d 109 (1st Cir., Mar. 18, 2003)

Court membership
- Judges sitting: Sandra Lynch, Conrad K. Cyr and Norman H. Stahl

Case opinions
- Opinion of the Court: Lynch

Doe v. Bush, 323 F.3d 133 (1st Cir. 2003), was a court case challenging the constitutionality of the 2003 invasion of Iraq. The case was dismissed, since the plaintiffs failed "to raise a sufficiently clear constitutional issue." The Authorization for Use of Military Force Against Iraq Resolution of 2002 was challenged by "a coalition of U.S. soldiers, parents of U.S. soldiers, and members of Congress" prior to the invasion to stop it from happening. They claimed that an invasion of Iraq would be illegal. Judge Lynch wrote of their argument, "They base this argument on two theories. They argue that Congress and the President are in collision -- that the President is about to act in violation of the October Resolution. They also argue that Congress and the President are in collusion -- that Congress has handed over to the President its exclusive power to declare war."

The case was dismissed on February 24, 2003, by Judge Joseph Tauro of the United States District Court for the District of Massachusetts. The petitioners appealed to the United States Court of Appeals for the First Circuit. On March 13, a three-judge panel affirmed the decision to dismiss the complaint. The opinion was written by Judge Sandra Lea Lynch:

An extreme case might arise, for example, if Congress gave absolute discretion to the President to start a war at his or her will... Plaintiffs' objection to the October Resolution does not, of course, involve any such claim. Nor does it involve a situation where the President acts without any apparent congressional authorization, or against congressional opposition... To the contrary, Congress has been deeply involved in significant debate, activity, and authorization connected to our relations with Iraq for over a decade, under three different presidents of both major political parties, and during periods when each party has controlled Congress.

Lynch also cited Massachusetts v. Laird 451 F.2d 26 (1st Cir. 1971), which similarly found that the Vietnam War was constitutional. Lynch concluded that the Judiciary could not intervene, because there was not a fully developed conflict between the President and Congress at that time. On March 17, the plaintiffs filed for a rehearing. Their petition was denied the next day. Iraq was invaded on March 20.

== See also ==
- Ehren Watada
- Legality of the Iraq War
- United Nations Charter
