= Prisoners Rights Union =

United Prisoners Union
- Logo of the Prisoners Rights Union
- Formation: November 17, 1970; 55 years ago
- Founders: John Irwin; Willie Holder; Wilbur "Popeye" Jackson
- Board of directors: Richard Herman; Yesenia Chan; Paul Comiskey

The Prisoners' Rights Union (PRU) was a prisoners' rights advocacy group, modelled after labor unions, founded in California in 1970. Its members paid dues, and its lawyers sued courts for better conditions. The organization still exists, but became effectively defunct as a mass member-run organization in the 1990s.

== History ==
On November 17, 1970, the idea for a prisoners union was born at a press conference held by former prisoners in support of the 1970 Folsom Prison strike. Its constitution argued that prisoners were an enslaved social class with the right to collective struggle for better conditions:

We the convicts and our people imprisoned or at large throughout the state of California are being subjected to a continuous cycle of poverty, prison, parole and more poverty; the same cycle that prisoners the world over have endured since the first man was enslaved. It is more than a game of Crime and Punishment; it is a social condition of inequality and degradation that denies us the opportunity to rise up and pursue a dignified way of life as guaranteed by the UNITED STATES CONSTITUTION. Once convicted, forever doomed has been the practice of society. We are the first to be accused and the last to be recognized. We are branded the lowest of all people: We the CONVICTED CLASS.

The right to organize for protection and survival is an inalienable right which is guaranteed to all people regardless of their social, racial, religious, economic, or political condition. Therefore, we the CONVICTED CLASS have banded together to form a cooperative Union to be hereafter called the UNITED PRISONERS UNION. We believe the creation of this Union will enable us to put an end to injustice, protect the lives and interests of our people, gain our constitutional rights and free us of our bondage.

In February 1971, the organization was created as the California Prisoners Union. By December 1971, the organization had 50 members, including both former prisoners and prison reform activists. The organization was soon renamed the United Prisoners Union.

In 1971, UPU published a "Bill of Rights", which declared that "We have been historically stereotyped as less than human, while in reality we possess the same needs, frailties, ambitions and dignity indigenous to all humans". The Bill of Rights demanded the abolishment of capital punishment; the prosecution of all prison, jail, parole, and military personnel for crimes inflicted upon prisoners; due process of law; the right to counsel of the prisoner's own choosing; a minimum wage and other labor rights; and many other prisoners' rights.

Although UPU's constitution used the language of class, and opposed capitalism, it largely eschewed the Marxist-Leninist and Maoist language of other radical California organizations, which would later fracture the organization.

In 1971, the organization claimed 3,000 members, 1/3 of which were current prisoners.

=== 1973 split ===
Over time, the UPU shifted away from work stoppages (strikes) in prisons and toward publicizing abuse, lobbying, and winning court cases. In 1972, as a result of one such case, UPU won the right to publish its Outlaw newspaper in San Quentin.

In 1973, the UPU accused Popeye Jackson of stealing money from the organization. In response, he went to the union office with a gun and chased staff members around and denounced the UPU as a white supremacist organization. As a result, the UPU split in two: The radical minority into the United Prisoners Union led by Popeye Jackson and the moderate majority into the Prisoners' Union (PU) headed by Willie Holder.

In the mid-1970's, this shift toward revolutionary rhetoric and political violence by Bay Area groups resulted in a rapid decrease in outside support for prison support groups.

In 1974, the Symbionese Liberation Army kidnapped Patty Hearst and demanded that the Hearst family distribute $400 million in food aid. The Hearsts funded a Seattle organization, People in Need (PIN), which worked with UPU, the American Indian Movement, and other organizations to distribute food.

On June 2, 1975, Popeye Jackson was shot dead by a member of the radical underground Tribal Thumb organization. After Popeye's death, the UPU splinter quickly disintegrated, leaving only the PU, which would later be renamed the Prisoners Rights Union (PRU).

=== Subsequent history ===
In 1976, in Jones v. North Carolina Prisoners' Labor Union, the Supreme Court ruled that prisoners do not have the right under the 1st Amendment to form a union, claiming that prisoner unions might increase the likelihood of prison riots. In fact, empirical evidence suggested that prisoner unions like PRU often worked to stop riots and to stop intra-prisoner violence.

In 1978, the Supreme Court ruled against PU's lawsuit to establish local PU union offices in prisons where they had a large membership.

UPU published Anvil from 1971 to 76 and The Outlaw from 1974 to 77. PRU published The California Prisoner from 1989 to 96. In 1991, The California Prisoner had a readership of 30,000.

PRU became defunct in the early 1990s, when its key lawyer Paul Comiskey moved to private practice as a criminal defense attorney.

== See also ==
- Walpole prison strike
- Political prisoners in the United States
- Anarchist Black Cross
