= Agustin Aguayo =

United States Army veteran and war resister

Agustín Aguayo
- Born: c. 1971; Guadalajara, Mexico
- Military career
- Allegiance: United States
- Branch: United States Army
- Service years: 2002 – 2007
- Rank: Specialist (reduced to Private after court-martial)
- Nickname: Augie
- Units: 1st Battalion, 18th Infantry Regiment, 2nd Brigade Combat Team, 1st Infantry Division
- Conflicts: Iraq War
- Awards: National Defense Service Medal; Iraq Campaign Medal
- Other work: Conscientious Objector Advocate

Agustín Aguayo (born c. 1971) is a veteran of the Iraq War. After several failed attempts to attain conscientious objector status, he deserted his unit in Germany in September 2006 to avoid redeployment to Iraq. He was convicted of desertion by a court martial March 6, 2007 and served six months in prison. His trial led Amnesty International to declare him a prisoner of conscience.

== Background ==
Aguayo is a U.S. citizen who was born in Guadalajara, Mexico. He enlisted in the United States Army in 2002 to earn money for his education. The following year, Operation Iraqi Freedom began.

Aguayo was trained by the Army as a combat infantryman. After his advanced individual training he was stationed in Germany and was deployed to the Middle East.

== Anti-war views ==
Aguayo stated during his trial that he was not anti-war at the time of his enlistment, and became anti-war as a result of his experiences in the Army. Before a deployment, he applied for retroactive conscientious objector status in February 2004, but was denied, reportedly by a vote of two to one by the three-person panel.

He was deployed to Tikrit, where he served a year as a combat medic. Aguayo stated during his trial that he only carried his weapon unloaded during his deployment. In 2005, he sued in federal court to force the Army to recognize him as a conscientious objector, but his suit was denied. After returning to the military base in Schweinfurt, Aguayo refused to carry a weapon.

== Imprisonment ==
While stationed in Germany, Aguayo was notified that his unit would be returned to Iraq and he left the military base. When military police came to his home in Schweinfurt, Germany on September 2, 2006, he climbed out of the bathroom window, going AWOL for 24 days. On September 27, he turned himself in at Fort Irwin in California.

On March 6, 2007, Aguayo was convicted of desertion by a court-martial in Würzburg, Germany. He was given a sentence of eight months' imprisonment out of a possible maximum of seven years. Aguayo told the court that "I tried my best, but I couldn't bear weapons and I could never point weapons at someone." An army prosecutor dismissed Aguyao's reasoning, stating, "His service was going to be important as a medic regardless of whether he was carrying a weapon or not." He was given a bad conduct discharge and his rank reduced to the lowest grade.

Following his conviction, Amnesty International named Aguayo a prisoner of conscience, arguing that he had taken "reasonable steps to secure release from the army" and that he was "imprisoned solely for his conscientious objection to participating in war".

== Release and activism ==
As Aguayo had already served 161 days in prison, he was released on April 18 and returned to his family in Los Angeles. On his return, he spoke of his experiences before an audience of antiwar activists, who gave him what the Los Angeles Times described as "a hero's welcome". Der Spiegel also described him as a "hero" to the US and European anti-war movements as a result of his trial.

Aguayo began a speaking campaign at U.S. schools to bring awareness to young people and educate them about the realities of war.

He was awarded the Stuttgart peace prize in December 2007.

== Family ==
Aguayo has a wife, Helga Aguayo, and two daughters.

== See also ==
- Stephen Funk
- List of Iraq War Resisters
- Nuremberg Principles (Principle IV)
