= 1970 Folsom Prison strike =

Prison labor dispute in Folsom, California

- Date: November 3, 1970 – November 22, 1970 (55 years ago)
- Location: Folsom, California, United States

Lead figures
| Martin Sousa, Inmate Sal Candelaria, Brown Berets Huey P. Newton, Black Panther Party Charles Garry, 3rd World Legal Defense Counsel | |

Number
| over 2,400 incarcerated workers | |

Item courtesy of Freedom Archives- "1970 Folsom Prison Strike Manifesto"

The 1970 Folsom Prison strike was a significant event for US prison reform and protest. During the strike, over 2,400 incarcerated individuals at Folsom State Prison in Folsom, California, initiated a work stoppage and hunger strike. The strike began on November 3, 1970, and lasted 19 days. The strike was organized to address various grievances, including racial discrimination, inadequate medical care, overcrowding and labor conditions. Prisoners from different backgrounds, including members of the Black Panther Party and Brown Berets, participated, helping the strike gain attention nationwide. The strike was declared the day prior to the 1970 California gubernatorial election, increasing public and political attention to the demands.

== Manifesto ==
The Folsom Prison manifesto, issued in 1970, outlined key areas where the incarcerated individuals sought reforms in the prison system. The organizing committee issued a manifesto, which reads in part:

"We the inmates of Folsom Prison have grown to recognize beyond the shadow of a doubt that because of our posture as prisoners and branded characters as alleged criminals, the administrators and prison employees no longer consider or respect us as human beings, but rather as domesticated animals selected to do their bidding in slave labor and furnished as a personal whipping dog for their sadistic, psychopathic hate.

In our efforts to intellectually expand in keeping with the outside world, through all categories of News Media, we are systematically restricted and punitively offended to isolation status when we insist on our human rights to the wisdom of awareness. "

== Demands ==
The Folsom Prison demands, as outlined in the manifesto, issued in 1970 outlined the key areas where the incarcerated individuals sought reform to the prison system. There were 31 demands listed in total.

1. Access to Legal Counsel
2. Improvement of Medical Services
3. Improved Visitation Rights
4. Explanation for Solitary Confinement
5. Set Time Limits for Solitary Confinement
6. No Political Segregation
7. Freedom from Political and Racial Discrimination
8. Right to Refuse Forced Labor
9. End Tear Gas Use on Isolated Prisoners
10. Abolition of Indefinite Sentencing
11. Fair Employment and Compensation
12. Right to Unionize
13. Earning Wages ( to support families)
14. Accountability for the Misconduct of Guards
15. Enforcement of Minimum Wage Laws
16. Political Asylum for Political Prisoners
17. Trial by a Jury of Peers
18. End to Physical Abuse
19. Protection for Political Prisoners
20. Expanded Legal Aid for Prisoners
21. Improved Working Conditions
22. Workplace Injury Compensation
23. Accredited Vocational Training
24. Transparency in Welfare Funds
25. Reform of the Parole Board
26. Creation of an Oversight Board
27. Compliance with the Folsom Manifesto
28. Stop Racial Manipulation by Authorities and Guards
29. Culturally Relevant Counseling
30. End Racial Bias in Parole Decisions
31. Right to be Present During Searches

Many of the demands raised in the manifesto continue to be points of discussion in the ongoing debate around prison reform and criminal justice. Topics such as overcrowding, racial disparities, and healthcare for inmates are still relevant concerns. While some of the reforms have been implemented since he demands were made, many of these issues remain central to prison reform advocacy efforts.

== Media ==
In October 1970, Sacramento’s KXTV (Channel 10) first reported a planned strike at Folsom State Prison set for November 3. Martin Sousa, the strike’s main organizer, worked in the prison print shop, where he printed copies of the demands and manifesto. Sousa then sent copies to the Prison Law Project and the Coordinating Council of Prisoner Organizations, both Bay Area activist groups. Fueled by outside support and media coverage from both local radio and television stations, the strike gained enough fire to last a historic 19 days. On November 17, 1970 outside support groups for the strike called a press conference. This formed the United Prisoners Union with the aid of Sousa. On November 22, Warden Craven broadcast a speech to the prisoners, offering them a chance to return to work, along with the consequences if they refused, thus ending the strike.

== Effects ==
During the strike almost all of the prisoners at the Folsom Prison refused to leave their cells for 19 days, becoming the longest prison strike in the US. The strike's notability has come from being nonviolent and the prisoners' unified stance despite their diverse political and racial backgrounds. The strike inspired a wave of prison reform movements across the country, most notably seen in the Attica Prison riot.
