= Massachusetts v. Laird =

1970 US Supreme Court case on conscription and the Vietnam War

- Supreme Court of the United States

Decided November 9, 1970
- Full case name: Commonwealth of Massachusetts, Plaintiff v. Melvin R. Laird, Secretary of Defense
- Citations: 400 U.S. 886 (more) 91 S. Ct. 128; 27 L. Ed. 2d 130; 1970 U.S. LEXIS 514

Holding
- Declined to hear the case.

Court membership
- Chief Justice Warren E. Burger Associate Justices Hugo Black · William O. Douglas; John M. Harlan II · William J. Brennan Jr. Potter Stewart · Byron White; Thurgood Marshall · Harry Blackmun

s
- Dissent: Douglas
- Dissent: Stewart
- Dissent: Harlan

Massachusetts v. Laird, 400 U.S. 886 (1970), was a case dealing with the conscription aspect of the Vietnam War that the Supreme Court declined to hear by a 6–3 vote.

The Commonwealth of Massachusetts challenged the constitutionality of the war. It passed a law stating that no resident of Massachusetts "shall be required to serve" in the military abroad if the armed hostility has not been declared a war by Congress. The attorney general of Massachusetts asked the Supreme Court to hear its case to test the legality of the Vietnam War.

The Supreme Court declined to hear the case due to a lack of jurisdiction.
