= C. S. Magaoay =

American researcher and activist

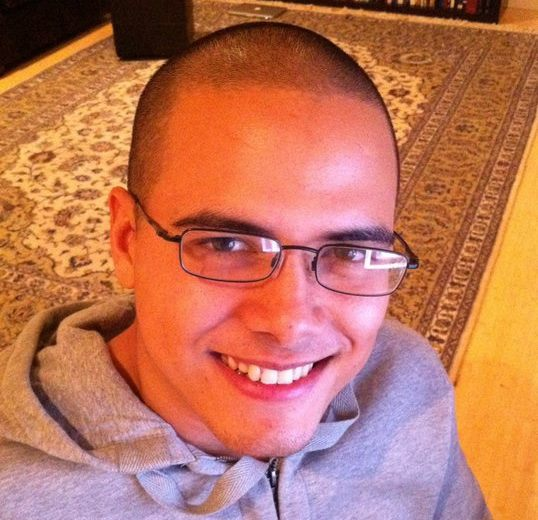
- Born: Christopher Scott Magaoay; September 21, 1985 (age 41); Wailuku, Hawaii, U.S.
- Occupations: Policy Analyst and Consultant
- Political party: Democrat
- Children: Chloe-Marie Mo'ikeha, Jean-Luke Magaoay, Preston Ernest Garret Magaoay

Christopher Scott Magaoay (born September 21, 1985), best known by his activist alias C. S. Magaoay, is an American researcher and activist best known for his outspoken stance on the war on terror and North America Immigration Policies. His statements have been published in newspapers, periodicals and books worldwide. He has also had interviews broadcast internationally, featured in multiple documentaries and spoken throughout Canada during his time there in exile during his unauthorized absence from the United States Marine Corps.

== Activism ==
While living in Canada, Magaoay became an active member of the War Resisters Canada network of activists. He spoke at anti-war rallies, events, and forums across Canada. Magaoay was a sought after speaker for organizations wishing to be educated of the ongoing wars in Iraq and Afghanistan from a "soldiers" perspective. In the five years spent in Toronto, he lectured at the University of Toronto, Ryerson University, York University, Geulph University Humber College, Seneca College and many other educational institutions in Ontario.

Throughout all of this, Magaoay attempted to permanently resettle in Canada with his wife at the time, Sahar Zerehi who was a Canadian citizen. However under the conservative parliament in power in Canada at the time, Canada's immigration policies were very strict even for spousal immigration. Magaoay became interested in the plight of immigrants and refugees in his activism. Over his last two years in Canada, Magaoay became a prominent voice in immigration politics in Canada and worked alongside Olivia Chow MP (NDP) and others.

In addition to anti-war and immigration activism, Magaoay also was elected to the board of the Ontario Public Interest Research Group for the University of Toronto. While a member he frequently voted to fund activist efforts by students and student groups of the university.

== Professional career ==
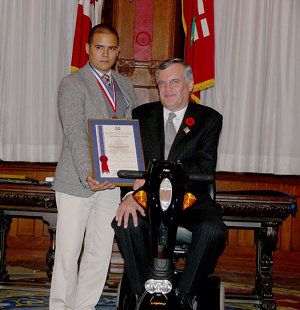
Christopher Magaoay being presented an award from the Lieutenant Governor of Ontario in 2008.

Upon arriving in Canada, Magaoay started his career as a new media marketing professional with Shahrvand Publications Ltd. in Toronto. He worked there as the Director of Creative Information Systems. There he worked with Shahrvand's staff to create new media presentations of current events pertaining to the Middle Eastern immigrant communities of Canada.

In 2006, Magaoay started Rubber Duck Media a New Media Public Relations and Marketing company. His client profiles included left-leaning Toronto City Councillors, Olivia Chow MP, Toronto and York Region Labour Council, Ontario Federation of Labour, United Food and Commercial Workers, and Fasken Martineau LLP.

In 2008, he was presented with an award from the National Ethnic Media and Press Council of Canada by the Lieutenant Governor of Ontario for best New Media presentation of current events. Magaoay was also made a permanent member of the Board of the National Ethnic Media and Press Council of Canada for his work promoting immigrant and refugee rights in Canada, specifically from the Middle East.

In 2010 after being released from Naval Brig Norfolk for his military charges.

== Personal life ==
After returning to the United States from Canada, Magaoay lived in New York for a brief period until his eventual return to Hawaii in 2011.
