= Kyle Snyder (soldier) =

American conscientious objector (born 1983)

- Kyle Snyder in US Army Photo taken during basic training
- Born: September 12, 1983 (age 43)
- Military career
- Branch: United States Army (now deserted)
- Service years: 2004 –
- Rank: Private First Class
- Unit: 94th Engineers
- Conflicts: Iraq War

Kyle Snyder (born September 12, 1983) is a Private First Class and combat engineer with the 94th Engineers based at Fort Leonard Wood, who deserted his Army unit while on mid-tour leave from Iraq and fled to Canada. His application for refugee status in Canada was denied.

== Childhood ==
Snyder spent most of his teenage years in foster care in Colorado after his parents divorced. His family is originally from Iowa. He has grandparents, aunts, uncles & cousins still living there.

== Enlistment ==
Snyder enlisted in the U.S. Army in 2004 one year after the war in Iraq had started. Prior to his deployment to Iraq, he requested a discharge through his chain of command "for medical reasons of manic depression." While on mid-tour leave from Iraq in 2005, Snyder deserted the Army.

On October 31, 2006, PFC Snyder held a press conference prior to turning himself in to the US Army at Fort Knox. Later, he claims the Army reneged on its promise, and so he deserted again.

== Arrest in Canada ==
On February 23, 2007, Snyder was arrested by local police in the town of Nelson, British Columbia then released when Citizenship and Immigration Canada informed the police they had no legal basis for arresting him. The decision to arrest came after information from an undisclosed source prompted the Nelson City Police to contact the Canada Border Services Agency who, according to Nelson Police Chief Constable Dan Maluta "said yes, we believe he is illegally in Canada and arrestable under the Immigration Act". Maluta acknowledged that the immigration agency was not their "original source" for information on Snyder, and Snyder reported that Josie Perry, the Canadian immigration official who ordered his release, had said that the arrest had been conducted at the behest of officials from the U.S. Army. A witness to the arrest reported that at the time of the arrest, the two officers said they did not have a warrant but could get one if necessary. Maluta confirmed that they did not have a Feeney warrant that would have allowed them into the home.

Member of Parliament Alex Atamanenko called for an official probe into the arrest. Chief Constable Dan Maluta has said that his police forces' actions will be investigated by the Abbotsford police, whose chief will have the authority to take disciplinary action.

== See also ==
- List of Iraq War Resisters
