= Malcolm Kendall-Smith =

Iraq War resister

Malcolm Kendall-Smith (born 1968/1969) is a former medical officer in the British Royal Air Force. He was born in Australia, was raised in New Zealand and has dual British-New Zealand citizenship.

He was the first British officer to face criminal charges for disobedience after challenging the legality of the war against Iraq. On 5 October 2005, he was charged with five counts of disobeying a lawful command between 1 June and 12 July 2005. Four of these relate to his refusal to carry out preparatory training with the final charge relating to his refusal to deploy to Iraq.

In October 2005 his solicitor, Justin Hugheston-Roberts, told the Sunday Times "He is not arguing that he is a conscientious objector. He is arguing that the war is manifestly unlawful."

Kendall-Smith was found guilty on all five charges of disobeying orders, sentenced to a penalty of eight months in prison and ordered to pay £20,000 costs.

== Pre-trial hearing ==
In a statement to the court martial at a pre-trial hearing in Aldershot, on 15 March 2006, Kendall-Smith said: "I am a leader. I am not a mere follower to whom no moral responsibility can be attached."

Philip Sapsford, QC, defending, told the court martial: "The flight lieutenant is entitled to advance before this tribunal that the use of force in Iraq was unlawful in international law," essentially reasoning that Kendall-Smith should be allowed to argue that any participation in the war effort was therefore unlawful. Sapsford added that the defence team was prepared to produce expert evidence to show that UN Resolution 1546, relied upon by the UK and US governments to justify the 2003 Invasion of Iraq, was no defence in international law. Sapsford also said he was considering calling former SAS soldier Ben Griffin, who recently resigned because of his objections to the war, to give evidence.

Prosecutors argued that the legal questions surrounding the invasion of Iraq were irrelevant and that the case should centre only around the official orders given to Kendall-Smith. Prosecutor David Perry argued that at the time Kendall-Smith refused to deploy, the invasion itself was over and British forces were in Iraq with the authority of U.N. Security Council resolutions passed after Saddam's fall. A ruling on 22 March 2006, by the judge advocate Jack Bayliss, concurred.

== Court-martial ==
A court-martial in Aldershot sat from 11 to 13 April 2006. Kendall-Smith was found guilty on all five charges of disobeying orders, and sentenced to a penalty of eight months in prison and ordered to pay £20,000 costs.

== See also ==
- List of Iraq War Resisters
- Ehren Watada
