= List of Iraq War resisters =

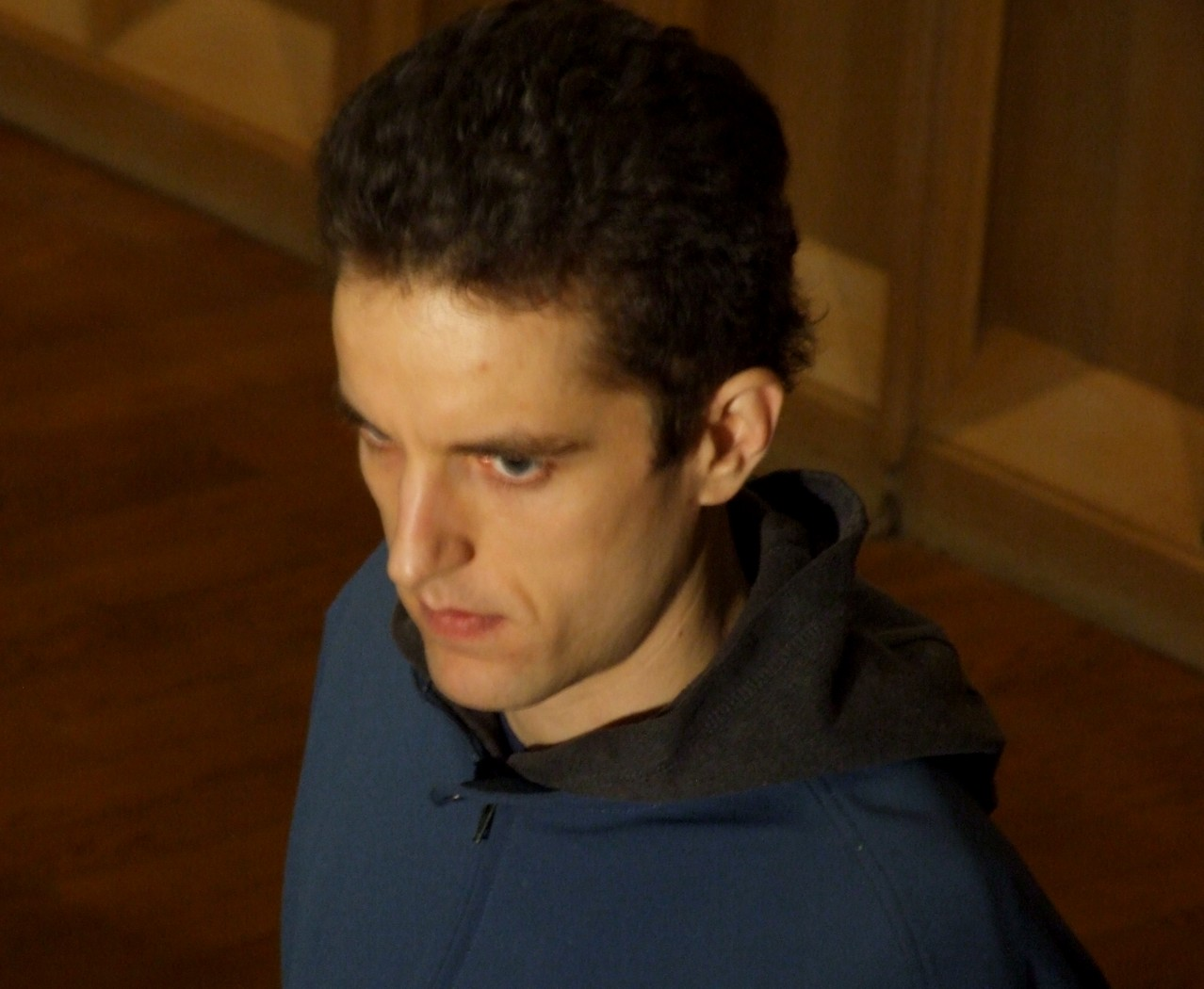
Jeremy Hinzman, the first American Iraq war deserter to seek refugee status in Canada.

Some soldiers of the coalition forces have refused to participate in the Iraq War. The following is a list of the more notable military personnel who have refused to participate in the Iraq War, broadly categorized by the reasons they themselves give.

== Objectors who moved to Canada ==
=== Legal and political ===
Pursuant to the Treaty between the Government of Canada and the Government of the United States of America on Mutual Legal assistance in Criminal Matters, US authorities can request Canadian authorities to identify, locate, and take into custody of US nationals who have committed a crime that carries a possible sentence of more than a year and subsequently extradite them back to US, pursuant to Extradition Treaty Between the United States of America and Canada. However, the government of the United States must promise those extradited will not receive the death penalty, in accordance with the ruling of United States v. Burns from the Supreme Court of Canada.

Because of the possibility that deserters have been issued with arrest warrants back in the United States and pursuant to those two agreements above, they are liable for arrest in Canada unless they legalize their status. This can be done by pursuing a refugee claim, about which the Immigration and Refugee Board of Canada (IRB) will hold a hearing and determine the validity of the claim. If refused, the claimant can appeal to the Federal Court, Federal Court of Appeal, and finally the Supreme Court of Canada, if leave is granted.

However, if the refugee claim is refused and subsequent appeals do not overturn the decision made by IRB, the claimant must leave Canada within 30 days under a removal order. If the claimant does not leave Canada within 30 days or failed to confirm departure details with Canada Border Services Agency, it automatically becomes a deportation order, enforceable by any peace officer in Canada.

=== Objectors who remain in Canada ===
- Peter Jemley
- Dale Landry
- David Sanders
- Kyle Snyder
- Rodney Watson – On August 5, 2009 he was ordered out of Canada by August 10, 2009, but this was delayed to August 19, 2009. It was again delayed to September 11, 2009. In light of this order of deportation, he appealed to the First United Church in Vancouver for right of asylum. His request was granted and he entered that church on September 18, 2009.

==== Objectors granted stay of deportation pending further decisions ====
- Corey Glass – On July 9, 2008, the Toronto Star reported that Corey Glass "is [now] permitted to remain in Canada until the Federal Court makes a decision on ... cases for judicial review." He was transferred to the IRR (Individual Ready Reserve ) where he remained under Army jurisdiction until they discharged him.
- Jeremy Hinzman
- Matt Lowell (October 27, 2008 and January 6, 2009)

==== Objectors granted new IRB panel to reconsider applications for permanent refugee status ====
("IRB" is Immigration and Refugee Board of Canada)

- Joshua Key – On July 4, 2008, Joshua Key won a Federal Court appeal, thus forcing the Refugee Board to re-examine his claim. Joshua Key will have a new hearing in front of the Immigration and Refugee Board. The Canadian Broadcasting Corporation's July 4, 2008, coverage of the story said that there is now a possibility that he "could qualify as a refugee". On June 3, 2009, Key had a new hearing in front of the Immigration and Refugee Board.

=== Objectors deported from Canada or left because of deportation order ===
==== Objectors who had applied for legal refugee status ====
- Robin Long – On July 16, 2008, the Toronto Star reported that Long "was ordered out of [Canada] last week after he failed to comply with bail conditions imposed when he missed an immigration hearing last year. He was deported yesterday."
- Chris Teske – January 23, 2009, Teske was the first war resister to be forced out of Canada who applied for legal refugee status, did not "fail to comply with bail conditions" (as Robin Long did), and yet was still issued a deportation order.
- Clifford Cornell – In January 2009, Cornell experienced some legal events. On February 4, 2009 Cornell "was arrested on Wednesday after crossing the border from Canada into Washington State". On February 23, 2009, Cornell was charged with the crime of desertion with the intent to "avoid hazardous duty and shirk important service". On April 29, 2009, Clifford was convicted of desertion and sentenced to one year in prison.
- Kimberly Rivera – On August 11, 2009, she was granted a new "Pre Removal Risk Assessment" hearing with a new officer. However, she was deported on September 20, 2012. She was sentenced to ten months' imprisonment and a bad conduct discharge.

==== Objectors who had not applied for legal refugee status ====
- Daniel Sandate – Deported at Niagara Falls, Canada on July 16, 2008, after having been in Canada for over 2 years. He was later court-martialed at Ft. Carson and given an 8-month prison sentence. Sandate released a written statement in prison about his opposition to the war in Iraq. He was released on January 20, 2009, at Ft. Sill, Oklahoma, and spoke publicly about his experience at a press conference in Oklahoma City on January 22, 2009.
- James Ashley – On December 23, 2008, the Toronto Star reported the following: "A 28-year-old man accused of deserting the U.S. army has been caught by Canadian police and turned over to U.S. authorities in Michigan. James Ashley was returned to the United States on Monday at the Blue Water Bridge in Port Huron. U.S. Customs spokesman Ron Smith says it's not clear if police caught Ashley at the bridge or elsewhere in Ontario. Smith says there's an arrest warrant for Ashley out of Fort Riley, Kansas." It is unclear whether or not Ashley had intended to legalize his status by pursuing a refugee claim with the Immigration and Refugee Board of Canada, or whether he had yet to do so. (See Immigration and Refugee Protection Act.)

=== Objectors who willingly returned to the US without deportation order ===
- Ivan Brobeck – Refused second tour in Iraq, USMC; returned to the USA to face court-martial for unauthorized absence and missing movement at Quantico in 2006. Ivan was given a 10 month sentence reduced to 63 days due to a pre-trial agreement. Brobeck received a bad conduct discharge.
- Darrell Anderson – Fled to Canada after 7 months in Iraq. Returned to US without court-martial.
- James Burmeister – Returned to US, turned himself in to authorities, was convicted of desertion July 16, 2008, and was sentenced to 9 months in prison. He was released October 28, 2008, after three months and 10 days in prison.

== Objectors claiming the war is illegal ==
- Ben Griffin – British SAS soldier who believes the war in Iraq was illegal and that the government lied about the war's conduct. He was allowed to leave the army with no charges filed against him.
- Malcolm Kendall-Smith – A British unit medical officer for the RAF who refused to deploy on the belief that the war was unlawful. He was charged with and convicted of 5 counts of refusing a lawful order. The judge in his case rejected the defense that the war was illegal, saying that the UK armed forces had full justification under United Nations resolutions to be in Iraq at the time of the charges and that a crime of aggression could not be carried out by such a junior officer.
- Wilfredo Torres
- Ehren Watada

== Conscientious objectors ==
For purposes of this list, the determination of conscientious objection is made by the individual, not a government. It is frequently the case that individuals and governments disagree on the status.

- Agustin Aguayo (Amnesty International Prisoner of Conscience)
- Kevin Benderman – Served one tour in Iraq then applied for conscientious objector status before his second tour. He was acquitted of desertion and found guilty of missing a troop movement. He was sentenced to 15 months in prison, demoted to private and given a dishonorable discharge.
- Ricky Clousing- US Army soldier
- Diedra Cobb
- Aidan Delgado – He applied for conscientious objector status in April 2003, which the Army eventually recognized, and he was honorably discharged in April 2004.
- Stephen Funk
- Katherine Jashinski
- Clifton Hicks
- Camilo Mejía
- Pablo Paredes – A Navy sailor who refused to board the USS Bonhomme Richard as it deployed to the Persian Gulf on December 6, 2004. A court martial found him guilty of absence without leave.
- Kimberly Rivera
- Abdullah William Webster (USA Amnesty International prisoner of conscience

== Other ==
- James Burmeister
- Ghanim Khalil
- Christopher Magaoay
- André Shepherd
- Suzanne Swift
- Carl Webb

== Punishments given to Iraq War resisters ==
Name	Country	Date convicted	Convicted of	Sentence	Actual prison time
Stephen Funk	United States	Sep 6, 2003	Unauthorized absence	6 months	6 months
Camilo Mejia	United States	May 21, 2004	Desertion	12 months	9 months
Abdullah William Webster (Amnesty International prisoner of conscience)	United States	Jun 3, 2004	Failing to obey commands from superior and missing brigade's movements	14 months	11 months
Kevin Benderman	United States	Jul 2005	Missing movement by design, desertion with intent to avoid hazardous duty	15 months	13 months
Malcolm Kendall-Smith	United Kingdom	Apr 13, 2006	Refusal to obey a legal order	8 months plus fine, etc.	2 months plus other penalties
Agustin Aguayo (Amnesty International prisoner of conscience)	United States	Mar 6, 2007	Desertion		7 months
Ryan Jackson	United States	May 30, 2008	Desertion	100 days	
***James Burmeister (Returned to the US without being given a deportation order.)	United States	Jul 16, 2008	Desertion	9 months	3 months and 10 days
***Robin Long (Applied for legal status; given a deportation order.)	United States	Aug 22, 2008	Desertion with the intent to stay away permanently	15 months	12 months
Tony Anderson	United States	Nov 17, 2008	Desertion	14 months	
***Daniel Sandate (imprisonment began July 16, 2008; ended January 20, 2009) (Did not apply for legal status; was deported.)	United States	Nov 17, 2008	Desertion	8 months	6 months
***Clifford Cornell (Applied for legal status; given a deportation order.)	United States	Apr 29, 2009	Desertion	one year, later reduced to 11 months	11 months (Released January 16, 2010)

"***" – Was in Canada as an Iraq war resister

== See also ==
- 2003 Invasion of Iraq
- Canada and Iraq War resisters
- Nuremberg Defense
- Opposition to the Iraq War
- Post–September 11 anti-war movement
- Protests against the Iraq war
- The Right to Refuse to Kill
