= Ehren Watada =

Iraq war resister

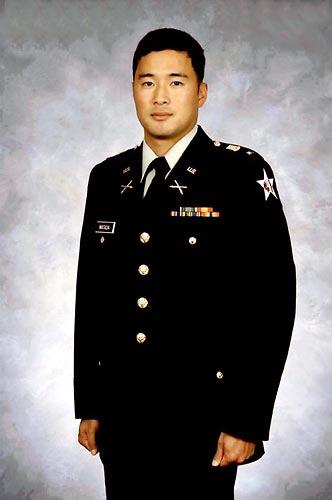
- Watada in uniform
- Born: Ehren Keoni Watada; 1978 (age 47–48); Honolulu, Hawaii
- Military career
- Allegiance: United States of America
- Branch: United States Army
- Service years: 2003–2009
- Rank: First Lieutenant (1LT)
- Units: G-37, HHC, I Corps (Ft. Lewis, WA)
- Awards: Army Commendation Medal, National Defense Service Medal, Global War on Terrorism Service Medal, Overseas Service Ribbon, Army Service Ribbon

Ehren Keoni Watada (born 1978) is a former first lieutenant of the United States Army, best known as the first commissioned officer in the US armed forces to refuse to deploy to Iraq. In June 2006, Watada refused to deploy for his unit's assigned rotation to Operation Iraqi Freedom, saying he believed the war to be illegal and that, under the doctrine of command responsibility, it would make him party to war crimes. At the time, he was assigned to duty with the 5th Battalion, 20th Infantry Regiment, part of the 3rd Brigade, 2nd Infantry Division, as a fire support officer. He was brought before a court-martial in 2007 which ended in a mistrial; the Army subsequently discharged him under "Other-Than-Honorable-Conditions" (OTH) in 2009. An OTH discharge is the least favorable type of administrative discharge from the Army, and is reserved for a "pattern of behavior that constitutes a significant departure from the conduct expected of Soldiers of the Army."

== Background and early service ==
Watada was born in Honolulu, Hawaii, to Robert Watada and Carolyn Ho. His father served for 10 years as executive director of Hawaii's Campaign Spending Commission and himself refused to serve in the Vietnam War. Ehren Watada attended Punahou School, then transferred in his sophomore year to Kalani High School, where he played cornerback on the varsity football team. An Eagle Scout, Watada graduated from Hawaii Pacific University magna cum laude in 2003 with a BA in finance.

Watada joined the Army after the war in Iraq had begun, stating that he was motivated "out of a desire to protect our country" after the September 11 attacks. He was commissioned by the Army's Officer Candidate School, on November 20, 2003, at Fort Benning, Georgia, as a second lieutenant of field artillery—one month after Security Council Resolution 1511 authorized a multinational force in Iraq. Watada served one year in South Korea, and was subsequently reassigned to Fort Lewis, Washington.

== Opposition to the Iraq War and trial ==
Soon after reporting to Fort Lewis, Watada discovered that his unit would be deploying to Iraq, in support of ongoing operations there. In preparation to deploy, he began conducting research on the country, its culture, and the reasons for the U.S. involvement in Iraq. Watada stated that, after reading several books and articles about the history of Iraq, international law, and the evidence used to justify the war, and speaking with veterans returning from Iraq, he ceased to believe in its legality and justification.

=== Attempt to resign ===
In January 2006, Watada attempted to resign. In his letter, he asserted that he was "wholeheartedly opposed to the continued war in Iraq", citing what he believed to be lawlessness and dishonesty in its justification. He came to the conclusion after doing his own personal research, including reading books by Seymour Hersh and James Bamford as well as learning about the Downing Street Memo, a British government document that stated that war in Iraq was "inevitable" and "the intelligence and facts were being fixed around the policy" of war. Watada also asserted, in discussions with other soldiers, that he and his fellow servicemen were complicit in war crimes. Watada stated that he was not a conscientious objector because he was not opposed to all wars as a matter of principle, and he stated that he had offered to serve in Afghanistan, which he regarded as "an unambiguous war linked to the September 11 attacks." This was refused; Watada, in turn, refused an offer for a desk job in Iraq without direct combat involvement, stating that the point of his protest was not about combat.

=== Charges and proposed court-martial ===
In response to Watada's refusal to deploy, the Army initially preferred seven specifications of various offenses under the Uniform Code of Military Justice (UCMJ). After the initial preferral, all but three specifications were dropped; the remaining charges sent to the court-martial were:

- Two specifications Conduct Unbecoming an Officer and a Gentleman (for statements made in speeches and interviews) (Article 133)
- One specification Missing Movement (for refusing to deploy to Iraq on June 22) (Article 87)

When the initial charges were preferred, Watada faced the possibility of a general court-martial and up to seven years in prison, as well as dismissal from the service. ("dismissal" is the only class of punitive discharge for U.S. commissioned officers; it is the equivalent of a dishonorable discharge, to which enlisted personnel may be sentenced.) Faced with these consequences, Watada said that he did not regret his decision, stating that he believed it to have been his moral responsibility:

When you are looking your children in the eye in the future, or when you are at the end of your life, you want to look back on your life and know that at a very important moment, when I had the opportunity to make the right decisions, I did so, even knowing there were negative consequences.

Regarding the charges, Watada's civilian attorney, Eric Seitz, commented:

Well, we expected him to be charged with missing movement or violating an order to get on a bus to accompany his unit to Iraq. We did not really anticipate that they would charge him with additional offenses based upon the comments and the remarks that he's made. And that opens up a whole new chapter in this proceeding, because what the Army has clearly tried to do by the nature of these charges is send out a message to people in the military, that if you criticize the war and if you criticize the decisions that were made to bring the United States into this war, that you, too, could be charged with disloyalty, contemptuous remarks and disrespect for higher officers, and in this case, specifically in this charge, the President.

==== Article 32 hearing ====
Watada's article 32 hearing to determine whether there was sufficient evidence to move forward with a general court-martial was held on August 17, 2006. The investigating officer Lt. Col. Mark Keith presided.

The Army prosecutor, Capt. Dan Kuecker, described Watada's actions as contemptuous of President George W. Bush, and argued that Watada's public statements hurt morale in his unit. He played video clips from a Veterans for Peace conference. In that speech, Watada called on his fellow soldiers to stop fighting.

Eric Seitz, Watada's civilian counsel, and Capt. Mark Kim, Watada's military lawyer, raised the issue of the legality of the war. Over the prosecutor's objections, Seitz and Kim called three witnesses to question the legality of the war. University of Illinois professor of international law Francis Boyle testified that the war is illegal because it was not authorized by the U.N. Security Council, and asserted that congress approved the war on the basis of faulty intelligence. Also testifying in Watada's defense were former United Nations Undersecretary Denis Halliday, and Army Colonel Ann Wright (ret.), who retired from the State Department in March 2003, in protest of the coming invasion. Like Boyle, both asserted that the war was illegal and that therefore Watada was within his rights to refuse participation in it. Also, the American Civil Liberties Union (ACLU) filed an amicus brief, saying that soldiers should not be court martialed for explaining their views.

On September 15, 2006, the Army announced that it had preferred another charge against Watada of "conduct unbecoming an officer and a gentleman". This brought the potential prison term faced by Watada to eight and a half years in prison if convicted of all charges. Six and a half of these years would have been for statements that he made concerning the war rather than his refusal to deploy to Iraq; "missing movement" is punishable by a maximum of two years. Keith justified the additional charge by asserting that "contempt for the President and the suggestion that US soldiers can stop the war simply by refusing to fight borders on mutiny and sedition. Seitz asserted that the Army added the new charge to make a public example of him: "He's not doing anything other than saying things he believes to be true, and that we believe are true. This makes it that much clearer that this is just a political prosecution, and that's really all this case has been about from the beginning."

Keith recommended Watada for court-martial on all charges, even as he said that he thought that Watada was "sincere in his beliefs". Of the court-martial recommendation, Seitz accused the Army of trying Watada without looking seriously at his arguments and that of the other experts appearing at the trial about the legality of the war.

On November 9, 2006, the U.S. Army announced the decision of the Fort Lewis commander, LTG James Dubik, that Watada would face a court martial. The charges of "contempt toward officials" were dismissed without comment. Without the "contempt for officials" charges, Watada could face up to four years confinement, two for missing movement and two for statements that he made, as well as a dismissal, and forfeiture of all pay and allowances, if convicted of the remaining charges.

Watada's defense team had intended to demonstrate that the war was illegal by maintaining that the required congressional approval was granted only on the basis of the existence of weapons of mass destruction (WMDs) in Iraq and ties between Saddam Hussein and al-Qaeda. They also intended to subpoena witnesses to testify and to cite the Nuremberg Principles, which require soldiers to disobey illegal orders. However, on January 16, 2007, Judge John M. Head ruled that Watada would not be allowed to present any defense based on the Nuremberg principles, stating that the legality of a war was a "nonjusticiable political question" and ruling that the order that Watada had refused was lawful. Watada was also forbidden to present a First Amendment defense. Seitz said about the rulings that "they are essentially saying there is no right to criticize, which we all know is not true", and that they intend to appeal any conviction to the federal courts.

At a pre-trial press conference Watada remarked that he believed it his duty to refuse to fight in the war, and that he was prepared to face prison time for his beliefs.

=== Court-martial ===
United States vs. Watada
- Court: Courts-martial of the United States
- Started: February 5, 2007
- Decided: February 7, 2007
- Verdict: Mistrial
- Charge: conduct unbecoming and missing movement

Case history
- Prior action: Article 32 hearing
- Subsequent action: Attempted retrial

Court membership
- Judge sitting: John Head

Watada was court-martialed in February 2007, with the case ending in a mistrial. On February 5, 2007, Watada's court-martial began with him entering a plea of not guilty to all of the specifications against him. He faced three specifications: one for missing movement, and two for "conduct unbecoming an officer and a gentleman" related to his public comments criticizing the Bush administration and the war. Panel selection was conducted on the first day, narrowing a pool of ten officers down to seven, ranking from captain through lieutenant colonel. The court-martial panel is similar to a jury in a civilian trial, but due to rules provided in the Uniform Code of Military Justice (UCMJ), panels consist of service members equal or senior in rank to the defendant.

On the second day of his court-martial, the prosecution presented opening arguments stating that Watada had "abandoned his soldiers and disgraced himself and the service" and began calling witnesses. The first witness called was Watada's former Battalion Commander, Lt. Col. Bruce Antonia. He testified that he learned of Watada's feelings about the war soon after Watada concluded, in early January 2006, that the war was illegal. Antonia stated, "I told him I was concerned. I did not want this to turn into a big media event." His chain of command counseled him on the consequences of his actions if he refused to deploy and used his position to make a spectacle of the issue. Lt. Col. William James, another officer who counseled Watada, testified that he found Watada's offer to serve in Afghanistan in "direct conflict" with Watada's written statement or stipulation that he did not want to deploy as a "tool" of the Bush administration. Watada had also stipulated that he had indeed missed his brigade's June deployment to Iraq and that he made a series of public statements against the war. In return for the stipulation, Army prosecutors had dropped several counts that knocked two years off the maximum six-year sentence.

Watada argued that his orders were unlawful, and Military Judge John Head ruled that the question could not be resolved within the military justice system, saying Watada's argument was reduced to an admission of guilt. The judge ruled that the court-martial was unable to decide the question of whether the deployment order was unlawful, and decided to strike Watada's stipulation, calling it an admission of guilt. Recognizing that the stipulation was the basis of the prosecution's case, Judge Head granted their request for a mistrial.

==== Attempted retrial and double jeopardy ====
United States vs. Watada
- Court: 9th circuit court of appeals
- Started: March 19, 2007
- Decided: May 6, 2009
- Verdict: Dismissed
- Charge: conduct unbecoming and missing movement

Court membership
- Judge sitting: Benjamin Settle

A new court martial was set for March 19, 2007 rescheduled for July 23, 2007, and then postponed until October 9, 2007, as an appeal based on the issue of double jeopardy delayed the case. Following the ruling on July 5, 2007, by Lt. Col. John Head, again presiding over Watada's court-martial, that double jeopardy did not apply, Watada's attorneys appealed the ruling to the U.S. Army Court of Criminal Appeals and then to U.S. civilian court. On October 5, 2007, U.S. District Court Judge Benjamin Settle stayed further proceedings until October 26. The Army challenged the injunction. Watada was represented by Ken Kagan and Jim Lobsenz with the Seattle law firm Carney Badley Spellman, who had replaced Eric Seitz. On the issue of double jeopardy, Joe Piek, spokesman for Fort Lewis, argued that the rules for courts-martial (MCM Rule 915(c)), allow the Army to try Watada again, on the theory that the mistrial is not a decision and that the mistrial was not due to prosecutorial misconduct. Others, including the military defense attorney assigned to Watada, as well as Kagan and Lobsenz, argued that double jeopardy attached at the start of the presentation of evidence. Rule 907(b)(2)(C) of the MCM states that jeopardy attaches at the "beginning of the presentation of evidence on the merits," raising the possibility that jeopardy attached prior to the declaration of mistrial.

The second court-martial was stayed in October 2007 by U.S. District Judge Benjamin Settle, on grounds of double jeopardy. Settle issued an order stating that Watada's "double jeopardy claim is meritorious" and that no evidence to the contrary was presented. The Army challenged the injunction, and Judge Settle ruled on October 21, 2008, that Watada cannot be retried on three of the five counts, but abstained from deciding whether the remaining two counts of conduct unbecoming an officer may go forward. On November 8, 2007, the injunction was extended by Judge Settle, who held that Lt. Watada's double jeopardy claim was meritorious.

The Army appealed to the 9th Circuit Court of Appeals in November, 2008. But after the Obama administration took office, the Justice Department asked the court to drop the case, which was dismissed on May 6, 2009.

=== Discharge ===
On October 2, 2009, the Army discharged Watada "Under Other-Than-Honorable-Conditions". Watada's defense attorney stated that in his opinion, "the Army came to the conclusion that it was not going to be able to prevail in a prosecution, and when the new solicitor general came in, her office had a fresh look at it, and as it was not bound by any of the decisions that had been made previously, they saw fit to put a stop to the appellate process."

An administrative discharge, "Under Other than Honorable Conditions" discharge is the least favorable type of administrative discharge from the Army. According to AR 635-200, an OTH discharge is reserved for a "pattern of behavior that constitutes a significant departure from the conduct expected of Soldiers of the Army."

=== Public reaction to the trials ===
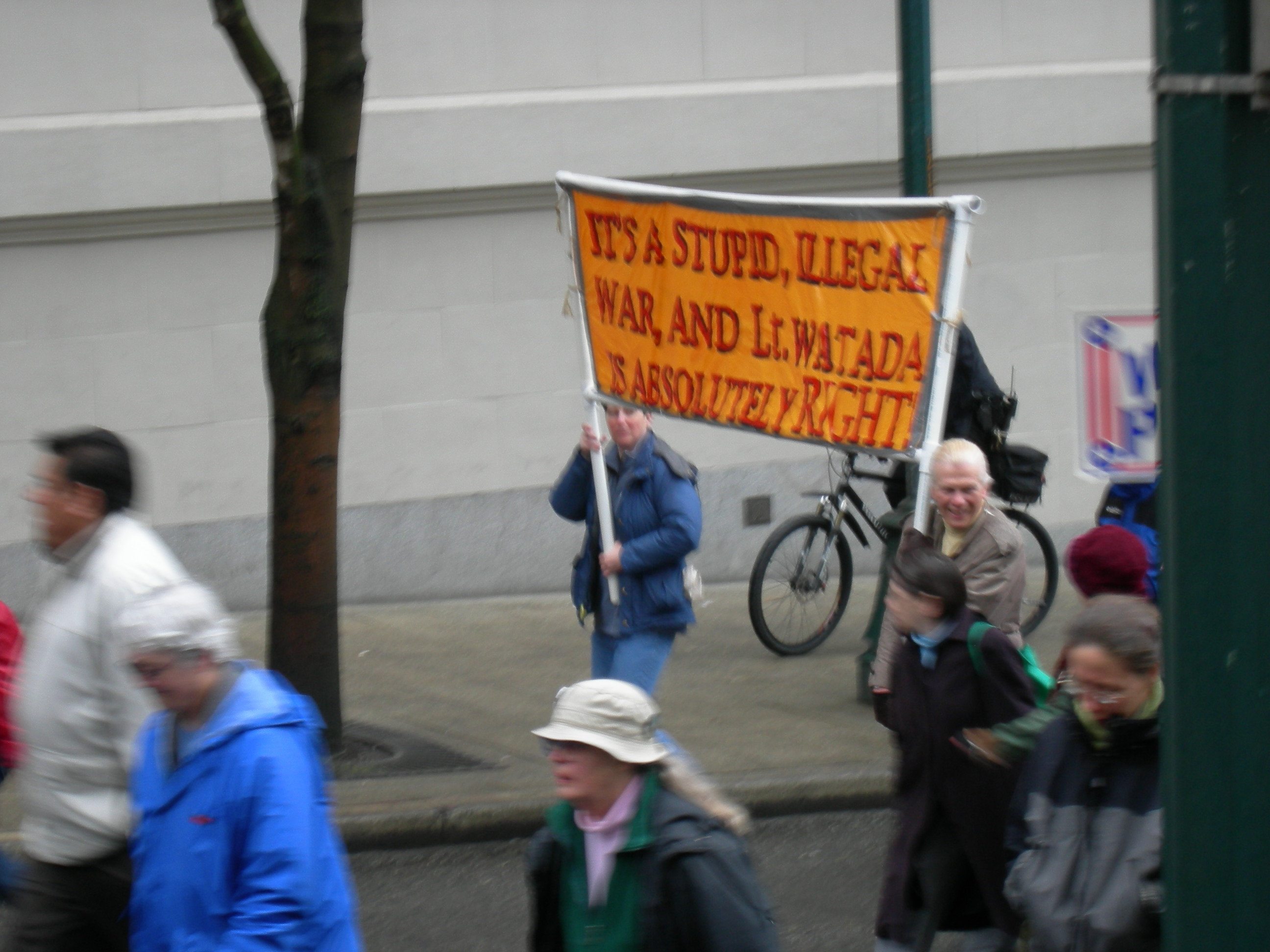
Banner in support of Watada at an anti-war demonstration, Seattle, March 2007

Rallies were held at the gates of Fort Lewis during the court-martial; the Seattle Post-Intelligencer reported that the first day drew "more than 1,000" supporters, including Desert Storm Veteran Dennis Kyne and the actor Sean Penn. Among the organizations supporting Watada were the ACLU, Iraq Veterans against the War, and Veterans for Peace. Watada told reporters that "almost every day, someone from the military or the outside sends me some kind of correspondence or approaches me in person to render support or their respect.” Amnesty International issued a press release stating that if Lt Watada were convicted and imprisoned, the organization would consider him a "prisoner of conscience and call for his immediate and unconditional release."

Others opposed Watada's actions. Some Japanese American veterans said that as a Japanese American he shamed the community. Watada reported that although he had not received open hostility from fellow soldiers, there was "definitely a tension". There were occasional counter demonstrations at Fort Lewis opposite his supporters.

Watada's mother, Carolyn Ho, became an anti-Iraq War activist, founding a website to support him, formerly at http://www.thankyoult.org. Watada's father, Bob, also became a critic of the war and went on a national tour to raise money for his son's defense, from October 26 to November 17, 2006. Both Bob and Ehren Watada spoke at the January 27, 2007 anti-war protest in Washington, D.C., alongside other prominent critics of the war, including Jane Fonda, Sean Penn, and Tim Robbins

At an event called the "Citizens' hearing on the legality of U.S. actions in Iraq" testimony that had been barred from Watada's courts martial was heard; among those testifying on January 20 and January 21, 2007 were:

- Daniel Ellsberg, Vietnam War-era whistleblower who leaked The Pentagon Papers
- Denis Halliday, who coordinated United Nations humanitarian aid to Iraq when he was UN Assistant Secretary-General
- Benjamin G. Davis, law professor, and expert on international law
- Marjorie Cohn, President of the National Lawyers' Guild
- Richard Falk Professor Emeritus of International Law at Princeton University;
- Antonia Juhasz Policy-analyst and author on U.S. economic policies in Iraq;
- John Burroughs Lawyers’ Committee on Nuclear Policy Executive Director
- Francis Boyle Professor of international law at Univ. of Illinois
- Darrell Anderson Army 1st Armored Division in Baghdad & Najaf; awarded Purple Heart;
- Harvey Tharp Former U.S. Navy Lieutenant and JAG stationed in Iraq;
- Geoffrey Millard 8 years in Army National Guard; awarded 13 medals;
- Dennis Kyne Desert storm Veteran & drill sergeant; trained in NBC warfare;
- Chanan Suarez-Diaz Former Navy hospital corpsman; Purple Heart and valor commendation
- Stacy Bannerman Military Families Speak Out; author of "When the War Came Home"
- Eman Khammas Iraqi human rights advocate

== Post-military life ==
In 2012, Watada founded and became the part-owner of the Bachi Burger restaurant in Las Vegas.

== See also ==
- Legality of the Iraq War
- List of Iraq War Resisters
- Crime against peace
- Criticism of the Iraq War
- Nuremberg Principles
- Ann Wright (United States Army colonel who publicly submitted her letter of resignation to then Secretary of State Colin Powell on March 19, 2003, one day before the U.S. invasion of Iraq.)
- Doe v. Bush (Appeals court decision on the constitutionality of the Iraq invasion)
- Malcolm Kendall-Smith
