= Robin Long =

US Army deserter

- Born: Boise, Idaho, U.S.
- Military career
- Allegiance: United States
- Branch: United States Army
- Service years: 2003–2008
- Rank: Private
- Unit: (see details)
- Awards: National Defense Service Medal and Army Service Ribbon

Robin Long is one of several U.S. Army deserters who sought asylum in Canada because of his opposition to the Iraq War and became the first of those to be deported to the United States after being rejected for refugee status. He was deported from Canada on July 15, 2008.

In July 2008, the Toronto Star quoted Bob Ages, chair of the Vancouver-based War Resisters Support Campaign who said that since the time of slavery, Canada has been known as a place of asylum, and Long's removal marks the first time an army deserter has been deported from Canada to the United States The Globe and Mail also reported this quote from Ages:

"Mr. Long's deportation would be a terrible precedent for Canada, especially given our history of providing sanctuary for war resisters, over 100,000 draft dodgers and deserters during the Vietnam era."

== Long's background ==
At the time he voluntarily enlisted in July 2003, Long believed that his country was justified in going to war in Iraq, his lawyer Shepherd Moss said at the court hearing to halt the deportation of July 2008. Long intended to train as a tank commander. "He wanted to go to defend his country", his lawyer stated.

Long trained for two years at Fort Knox in Kentucky. His perspective changed while in training at the Army base at Fort Knox. After hearing that weapons of mass destruction had not been found in Iraq, Long thought the U.S. had no reason for being at war. Also, in 2004 he was troubled by evidence of abuse of Iraqi detainees that came out in May 2004, according to his lawyer, Shepherd Moss, in July 2008.

Long concluded the abuse was systemic and condoned by the U.S. administration, Moss said. After some soul-searching, Long decided he would not go to Iraq and would not participate or be complicit in what he believed were war crimes, the lawyer said.

Long reportedly decided that he didn't want to go to Iraq after talking to people who had been there: "These people came back and were telling these horrific stories and our superiors were egging people on, some people were actually volunteering to go over there and it just seemed like justified homicide", he said in the interview. "It didn't sit right in my stomach. I morally couldn't do it." Long was ordered in March 2005 to report to Iraq for service. In 2005, he left his military base in Colorado Springs, and went to Toronto.

== In Canada from 2005 to July 15, 2008 ==
Long sought to be accepted as a refugee in September, 2006. His application for refugee status was denied on February 15, 2007. An application for leave to appeal the decision was turned down. Long moved to British Columbia in the summer of 2007. While there Long said he perfected his organic gardening skills and converted his Volkswagen to run on recycled cooking oil.

In 2007, he failed to comply with bail conditions imposed when he missed an immigration hearing.

== The events of July 14 and 15, 2008 ==
In a final attempt to stay in Canada, Long applied on July 14, 2008, for a stay of the removal order in order to allow him further judicial appeals.

Long's case was heard on July 14, 2008, in front of Madam Justice Anne Mactavish of the Federal Court of Canada. Long was not in court for the hearing. He was in custody at a location outside Vancouver.

Judge Mactavish stated that Long did not provide evidence to show he would be singled out for harsh treatment by the U.S. military because of the publicity associated with case. However, a month later, on August 22, 2008, in Long's court martial trial in the United States, "Prosecutors called no witnesses to disparage Long's character. Instead, they showed a six-minute video of Long, sporting dreadlocks and a beard, telling a Canadian news reporter "I think I was lied to by my president."

The fact that this "aggravating" evidence was accepted as admissible at the court martial for the charge of desertion was later the subject of much attention (see "aggravation" below) in Canada at the hearing of another war resister: On September 22, 2008, after the Federal Court hearing of Jeremy Hinzman, the Toronto Star reported the following:

Jeremy Hinzman's lawyer Alyssa Manning told judge Richard Mosley that new evidence suggests outspoken critics of the 2003 American-led invasion of Iraq face harsher treatment than other deserters. For example, she said, deserter Robin Long was sentenced to 15 months in prison last month after prosecutors made mention of a media interview he had given in Canada before he was deported in July ... The issue of "differential" treatment for those who have spoken out against the U.S.-led invasion appeared to trouble Judge Mosley.

"I don't know how it is an aggravating feature or element to be introduced in sentencing", the judge said. ... "Based on the evidence and submissions before me, I am satisfied that the applicants (Jeremy Hinzman and family) would suffer irreparable harm if a stay were not granted pending determination of their leave application," Mosley said in his three-page endorsement."

Long was removed from Canada on July 15, 2008. Madam Justice Anne Mactavish of the Federal Court of Canada "cleared the way for the deportation."

== In the U.S. beginning July 15, 2008 ==
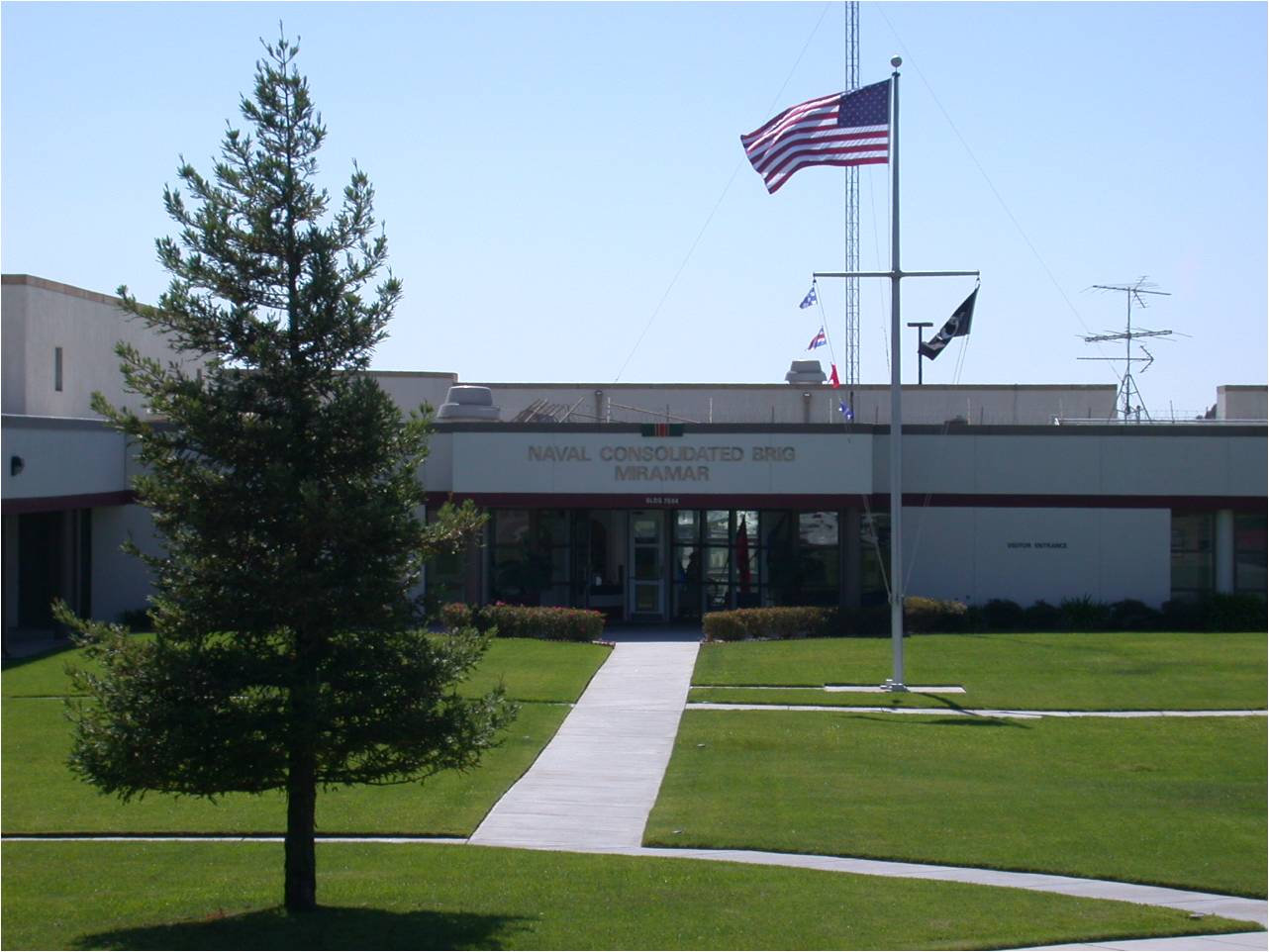
Naval Consolidated Brig, Miramar, where Long served his sentence

He was court-martialed at Fort Carson, Colorado in August 2008. At the trial, Long pleaded guilty to desertion and was given a sentence of 15 months in prison, reduction in rank to E-1 private, and a dishonorable discharge.

Robin Long was represented by James M. Branum (of Pine Ridge, Oklahoma), William Durland (of Colorado Springs, Colorado) and Captain Seth Cohen (of the U.S. Army Trial Defense Service). Long's principal sentencing arguments focused on the morality of civil disobedience and Long's rehabilitative potential, while the government's sole case in aggravation was a video interview that the Canadian Broadcasting Corporation did with Long.

Long served the remainder of his sentence at the Miramar Consolidated Naval Brig near San Diego, California.

On November 6, 2008, Long authored an open letter to then President-elect Barack Obama which included the following words:

I feel I made the right decision by refusing and am more than willing to sit in the brig for my ideals. But I worry about the effect this has on my family. I ask you to please consider granting me presidential clemency or a pardon. I have given this to many different organizations and people to ensure that you receive a copy.

On March 15, 2009, two members of the Parliament of Canada visited Long in prison. They were Olivia Chow (New Democratic Party), and Borys Wrzesnewskyj (Liberal Party of Canada).

On July 9, 2009, Robin Long was released from prison.

On August 12, 2009, the Boise Weekly published this statement:

In addition to his incarceration, Long was stripped of his rank and given a dishonorable discharge. His discharge remains on appeal. As he tours the country speaking out in opposition to the war, Robin Long remains in the Army, getting military medical benefits, though he is no longer being paid.

He argues that his desertion was not dishonorable and that the unfavorable discharge status--a felony--affects his ability to return to his family in Canada and his ability to get work in the United States.

In Long's open letter to Obama, he asked for a better discharge status: "I have given this to many different organizations and people to ensure that you receive a copy."

He has not heard back but continues the appeal. His wife is unable to move to the United States because she receives full medical benefits for her MS in Canada and would not be able to get treatment here, his lawyer, Branum said.

As of August 2010, Long lives in San Francisco and survives on odd jobs in gardening and carpentry to pay for a college program to become a massage therapist.

=== Continued activism ===
After his incarceration, Long toured the U.S. speaking out in opposition to the Iraq War. In October 2009, he was sponsored on a trip to Israel and Palestine to speak to army resisters there and meet with high-school students. As of August 2010, Long has been sharing his experience on college campuses.

== See also ==
- Canada and Iraq War resisters
- Canada and the Iraq War
- Citizenship and Immigration Canada
- Conscientious objector
- Desertion
- Immigration and Refugee Protection Act
- Nuremberg Defense
- List of Iraq War resisters
- Right of asylum
- War Resisters Support Campaign
