= Camilo Mejía =

US Army deserter and activist

- Born: August 28, 1975 (age 51); Managua, Nicaragua
- Military career
- Allegiance: United States of America (deserted)
- Branch: United States Army (deserted)
- Service years: ?1995?-2004
- Rank: Private (demoted from staff sergeant)
- Conflicts: Iraq War
- Other work: Road from Ar Ramadi: The Private Rebellion of Staff Sergeant Mejía

Camilo Ernesto Mejía (born August 28, 1975) is a Nicaraguan who left the United States Army during the Iraq War on conscientious objector grounds, was convicted of desertion and went on to become an anti-war activist.

== Service and court-martial ==
Mejía is a graduate of the University of Miami in Coral Gables, Florida, where he majored in psychology and Spanish. Mejía spent six months in Iraq (his first and only combat tour). Mejia returned to the United States on a 2-week furlough in order to address an issue with his Lawful Permanent Resident (LPR) status; after which he did not return for duty. He was charged with desertion and sentenced to one year in prison for refusing to return to fight in Iraq. In March 2004, he turned himself in to the US military and filed an application for conscientious objector status.

On May 21, 2004, Mejía was convicted of desertion by a military jury and sentenced to one year confinement, reduction to the rank of Private E-1, and a Bad Conduct Discharge.

Mejía served his sentence at the Fort Sill military prison in Lawton, Oklahoma. During his time in custody, he was recognized by Amnesty International as a prisoner of conscience and was awarded by Refuse and Resist with its Courageous Resister Award. He was also the recipient of the Peace Abbey Courage of Conscience Award which was presented by his attorney Louis Font. Camilo was recognized by the Detroit, Michigan, City Council with a commendation for his stand.

== After prison ==
Camilo Mejía was released from prison on February 15, 2005. Since his release, he has spoken at many peace protests and to the press about his experiences and his opposition to the war in Iraq. In 2005, he was recognized with the 'Young Leader Award' by Global Exchange, in San Francisco.

In August 2005, Camilo along with Desert Storm Veteran Dennis Kyne, stormed President Bush's vacation ranch house with Cindy Sheehan and future members of Camp Casey.

Mejía has recently written a book entitled Road from Ar Ramadi: The Private Rebellion of Staff Sergeant Mejía which recounts his journey of conscience in Iraq.

Mejía is interviewed in "The Ground Truth: After the Killing Ends (2006)", a documentary about the training and alleged dehumanization of U.S. soldiers, and how they struggle to come to terms with it when they come back home. In August 2007, Mejía was named the chair of the board of directors of Iraq Veterans Against the War.

== Song about Mejía ==
In early 2006, alternative reggae/rock band State Radio released the album Us Against the Crown, which features the song "Camilo". When they heard of his story, State Radio wanted to bring conscientious objection to light. Lyrics in the song reflect on Camilo Mejía's situation:

Twenty days in a concrete fallout/ What life have I to take your own/ Oh my country, won't you call out/ Doorbells are ringing with boxes of bones/ And from another land's war torn corners/ To a prison cell in my own/ Punish me for not taking your orders/ But don't lock me up for not leavin' my home Camilo/ Camilo/ Leaving my home/ Camilo/ Camilo

== See also ==
- List of Iraq War resisters
- Peter Lilienthal
- Nuremberg Principles#Principle IV

== Further Information ==
- Zeiger, David, Evangeline Griego, Aaron Zarrow, Troy Garity, and Edward Asner. Sir! No sir! a David Zeiger film. New York, NY: Docurama Films, 2006. ISBN 0767091930
