= Stephen Funk =

- Born: June 15, 1982 (age 43); Seattle, Washington
- Branch: United States Marine Corps
- Service years: 2002–2004
- Rank: Private
- Other work: Founder & Artistic Director, Veteran Artists

Stephen Funk (born June 15, 1982) is a former United States Marine Corps Landing Support Specialist and Lance Corporal reservist. He was the first person to publicly refuse to deploy in Iraq.

== Background ==
Stephen Funk decided to enlist in the United States Marine Corps after 9/11, signing a six-year contract in February 2002. Near the end of boot camp, he shot expert at the rifle range, at 200-, 300- and 500-yards. Despite this, his instructor told him that he would not shoot as well in combat; Funk later said, "I told him he was right, because I felt killing was wrong."

Prior to enlisting, Funk had a background in social activism having attended an alternative high school called The Nova Project. He participated in protests against the World Trade Organization in Seattle and the during the Democratic National Convention in Los Angeles.

His period of "unauthorized absence" lasted from February 9, 2003, to April 1, 2003.

On April 1, 2003, Funk held a press conference at the main gate of San Jose Marine Reserve Base and turned himself over to military authorities. During the conference, Funk spoke to reporters and said "There is no way to justify war because you're paying with human lives." Just before being taken into custody. Funk had attempted to obtain conscientious objector status and a discharge. His conscientious objector application was never reviewed, instead he was court-martialed. At the same time he applied for conscientious objector status, Funk also came out publicly as a gay man. In 2003, while imprisoned, he was named as one of OUT Magazine's "Out 100".

== Military punishment ==
Of the two charges Funk was brought up on, a military jury acquitted him on September 6, 2003, of desertion, but convicted him of the lesser charge of unauthorized absence. He had spent 47 days of unauthorized absence preparing his application for conscientious objection and was sentenced to six months imprisonment, reduction in rank from E-3 to E-1 and given a bad-conduct discharge.

== Controversy ==
It is noteworthy that the United States punished him "for refusing to report to his unit during the Iraq war," during the period of his "unauthorized absence" (Feb 9, 2003 to April 1, 2003), which occurred before the May 22, 2003, adoption of United Nations Security Council Resolution 1483. (That resolution affirmed that the United States and the United Kingdom had responsibility for Iraq as the "occupying powers under unified command.")

This sequence of events means that United States punished Stephen Funk for refusing to "report to his unit during [a] war" not sanctioned by the United Nations. This fact has major implications in international law: In an interview given on August 25, 2006, about the "2003 invasion of Iraq,...[ Benjamin B. Ferencz, an American lawyer ],...said the United Nations charter, which was written after the carnage of World War II, contains a provision that no nation can use armed force without the permission of the UN Security Council." Ferencz is qualified to make comparisons to the Nuremberg Trials because he, himself, was an investigator of Nazi war crimes after World War II and the Chief Prosecutor for the United States Army at the Einsatzgruppen Trial, one of the twelve military trials held by the U.S. authorities at Nuremberg, Germany. One of the legal principles used during those trials was Nuremberg Principle IV which deals with the responsibility of individuals. It states, "The fact that a person acted pursuant to order of his Government or of a superior does not relieve him from responsibility under international law, provided a moral choice was in fact possible to him." The precedents and principles of international law that were set during the Nuremberg Trials have legal relevance to all subsequent cases, including that of Stephen Funk.

== Aftermath ==
Stephen Funk was confined in the Marine Corps Base Camp Lejeune Brig and served 5 months of a 6-month sentence. During his confinement, anti-war activists organized a major protest outside the base along with a bus tour of speakers traveling the east coast. It was coordinated with rallies in several major cities including San Francisco, New York City, Los Angeles, Chicago, Seattle, New Orleans, Paris, and London.

Upon release Funk returned to the San Francisco Bay Area enrolling at Stanford University to study international relations. Upon graduation, Condoleezza Rice, now a professor at the school, handed Funk his degree. He continued his peace activism becoming an honorary founding member of Iraq Veterans Against the War in 2004. Funk is also founder and creative director of Veteran Artists, an organization "founded and run by recent military veterans connecting other veterans with community resources to pursue artistic opportunities."

== See also ==
- List of Iraq War Resisters
- Opposition to the Iraq War
