= United States immigration statistics =

Immigration to the United States over time by region

In 2022, there were 46,118,600 immigrant residents in the United States or 13.8% of the US population according to the American Immigration Council. Of these, 9,940,700 were undocumented or illegal, making up 21.6% of all immigrants or 3% of the total US population.

The 1850 United States census was the first federal U.S. census to query respondents about their "nativity"—i.e, where they were born, whether in the United States or outside of it—and is thus the first point at which solid census statistics become available. The following chart, based on statistics from the U.S. census from 1850 on, shows the numbers of non-native residents according to place of birth. Because an immigrant is counted in each census during his or her lifetime, the numbers reflect the cumulative population of living non-native residents.

This census-based approach to measuring historical U.S. immigration statistics produces only a rough approximation because census surveys are conducted only every ten years, yielding only decadal estimates of net migration (immigration to the country minus emigration from it: as proxied by net changes in the stock of foreign-born residents). The chart (above and to the right here), "Immigration to the United States by region (millions)," is a somewhat more accurate depiction, although it too measures only ten year blocks (think of it as a bar graph rather than the line graph displayed), and, as pointed out in the "More Details" to it, the levels shown are valid only through 2010. Actual year by year immigrant arrivals data (with some — not always consistent over time — adjustment correcting for visitors who do not remain permanently), provide more fine-grained measurement, and are available starting as of 1820. However, those data, which were categorized by U.S. immigration authorities as "Immigrants" until about 2000, but since then as "Persons Obtaining Lawful Permanent Resident Status" (yet still labeled "Immigrants" even for years after 2000, in the chart above right), also have inconsistencies over time, most notably because the numbers tabulated reflect actual written recording of (most) non-U.S. citizens arriving before 1933, but -from then on- bestowal of permanent residencies ("green cards").

== Statistics by year ==
Data since 2023 has been rounded to the nearest tenth.

=== Naturalization ===
This table lists the number of naturalizations, petitions along with the number accepted or denied from the 2024 to 2000 fiscal years. Source:

Year	Accepted	Denied	Applications
2024	818,570▼	86,410	994,130
2023	878,460▼	100,490	827,610
2022	969,380▲	111,637	781,075
2021	813,861▲	85,170	789,119
2020	628,254▼	80,609	967,755
2019	843,593▲	97,789	830,560
2018	761,901▲	92,631	837,168
2017	707,265▼	83,176	986,851
2016	753,060▲	86,033	972,151
2015	730,259▲	75,810	783,062
2014	653,416▼	66,767	773,824
2013	779,929▲	83,112	772,623
2012	757,434▲	65,874	899,162
2011	694,193▲	57,065	756,008
2010	619,913▼	56,994	710,544
2009	743,715▼	109,832	570,442
2008	1,046,539▲	121,283	525,786
2007	660,477▼	89,683	1,382,993
2006	702,589▲	120,722	730,642
2005	604,280▲	108,247	602,972
2004	537,151▲	103,339	662,796
2003	462,435 ▼	91,599	523,370
2002	572,646▼	139,779	700,649
2001	606,259▼	218,326	501,643
2000	886,026	399,670	460,916

=== Persons getting permanent resident status ===
This table gives the number of people who got permanent resident status in the United States by fiscal year from 1980 to 2023. Includes those who are "lawful permanent residents" only in this table. Source:

Year	Total #
2024	1,364,090▲
2023	1,172,910▲
2022	1,018,349▲
2021	740,002 ▲
2020	707,362 ▼
2019	1,031,765 ▼
2018	1,096,611 ▼
2017	1,127,167 ▼
2016	1,183,505 ▲
2015	1,051,031 ▲
2014	1,016,518▲
2013	990,553▼
2012	1,031,631▼
2011	1,062,040▲
2010	1,042,625▼
2009	1,130,818▲
2008	1,107,126 ▲
2007	1,052,415▼
2006	1,266,129▲
2005	1,122,257▲
2004	957,883▲
2003	703,542▼
2002	1,059,356▲
2001	1,058,902▲
2000	841,002▲
1999	644,787▼
1998	653,206▼
1997	797,847▲
1996	915,560▲
1995	720,177▼
1994	803,993▼
1993	903,916▼
1992	973,445▼
1991	1,826,595▲
1990	1,535,872▲
1989	1,090,172▲
1988	641,346▲
1987	599,889▼
1986	600,027▲
1985	568,149▲
1984	541,811▼
1983	550,052▲
1982	533,624▼
1981	595,014▲
1980	524,295

==== Naturalizations by class of admission by year ====
This table lists the number of naturalizations by the major admission class they admitted to the US in by fiscal year. Between 2013 and 2022 none gained admission and became a lawful permanent resident who were children and born abroad. Source:

	Year	2024	2023	2022	2021	2020	2019	2018	2017	2016	2015	2014	2013	
Major Admission class	Immediate relatives of U.S. citizens	672,240	551,590	428,268	385,396	321,148	505,765	478,961	516,508	566,706	465,068	416,456	439,460	
Major Admission class	Employment-based preferences	171,120	196,760	270,284	193,338	148,959	139,458	138,171	137,855	137,893	144,047	151,596	161,110	
Major Admission class	Family-sponsored preferences	188,190	204,240	166,041	65,690	121,560	204,139	216,563	232,238	238,087	213,910	229,104	210,303	
Major Admission class	Asylees	41,650	40,330	53,659	20,550	19,471	26,003	30,175	25,647	37,209	33,564	38,176	42,235	
Major Admission class	Refugees	178,200	59,030	29,423	35,847	44,404	80,908	155,734	120,356	120,216	118,431	96,066	77,395	
Major Admission class	Victims of crimes and their immediate relatives	12,990	19,720	9,871	9,216	11,888	18,326	14,909	17,993	16,148	14,112	11,665	3,712	
Major Admission class	Cancellation of removal	4,330	4,900	4,160	5,017	3,685	4,033	4,421	3,539	3,453	4,713	5,248	5,763	
Major Admission class	Diversity	49,890	67,350	43,230	15,150	25,030	43,460	45,350	51,590	49,870	47,930			
Major Admission class	Certain Iraqis and Afghans employed by U.S. Government and their spouses and children	43,260	26,430	11,910	8,300	9,730	8,080	10,300	19,190	12,150	7,050			
Major Admission class	Victims of human trafficking	570	800	712	942	866	818	1,208	1,317	1,069	970	1,149	608	
Major Admission class	Parolees	10	10	14	13	13	16	14	26	15	23	95	556	
Major Admission class	Other	950	1,140	607	429	534	579	636	758	565	782	956	911	
Major Admission class	Total		1,364,090	1,172,910	1,018,349	740,002	707,362	1,031,765	1,096,611	1,127,167	1,183,505	1,051,031	1,016,518	990,553

=== Refugees ===
==== Arrivals by year ====
This table lists the number of refugee arrivals by each fiscal year along with the ceiling. Since the United States created a refugee resettlement program in 1980, there has been a ceiling on the number allowed. The Immigration and Nationality Act gives the president the authority to set the ceiling. The year with the lowest ceiling was in 2021. The years where the number of refugees admitted surpassed the ceiling was in: 1992 and 2017. Note that data from the 2024 fiscal year has been rounded.

Year	Number of arrivals
2024	100,060 ▲
2023	60,050 ▲
2022	25,519 ▲
2021	11,454▼
2020	11,840▼
2019	29,916▲
2018	22,405▼
2017	53,691▼
2016	84,989▲
2015	69,920▼
2014	69,975▲
2013	69,909▲
2012	58,179▲
2011	56,384▼
2010	73,293▲
2009	74,602▲
2008	60,107▲
2007	48,218▲
2006	41,094▼
2005	53,738▲
2004	52,840▲
2003	28,286▲
2002	26,785▼
2001	68,920▼
2000	72,165▼
1999	85,285▲
1998	76,712▲
1997	69,653▼
1996	75,421▼
1995	98,973▼
1994	111,680▼
1993	114,181▼
1992	115,548▲
1991	113,389▼
1990	122,066▲
1989	107,070▲
1988	76,483 ▲
1987	64,528▲
1986	62,146▼
1985	67,704 ▼
1984	70,393▲
1983	61,218▼
1982	98,096▼
1981	159,252▼
1980	207,116

=== Asylum seekers ===
This table shows the number of people who were granted asylum whether it be defensively or affirmatively by fiscal year starting in 1990. Please note that data from the source for 2023 is rounded to the nearest tenth. Table source:

Year	Granted defensive status	Granted affirmative status	Total
2023	32,050	22,300	54,350
2022	22,481	14,134	36,615
2021	7,416	9,212	16,628
2020	14,604	16,132	30,736
2019	18,912	26,893	45,805
2018	13,198	24,504	37,702
2017	10,565	15,817	26,382
2016	8,695	11,616	20,311
2015	8,139	17,807	25,946
2013	9,745	14,886	24,631
2012	10,575	16,871	27,446
2011	10,138	13,493	23,631
2010	8,519	11,258	19,777
2009	10,300	12,003	22,303
2008	10,892	12,130	23,022
2007	12,859	12,459	25,318
2006	13,304	13,048	26,352
2005	11,757	13,547	25,304
2004	13,022	14,354	27,376
2003	13,376	15,367	28,743
2002	10,977	25,960	36,937
2001	10,001	29,147	39,148
2000	9,236	23,278	32,514
1999	8,421	18,150	26,571
1998	7,291	13,216	20,507
1997	6,559	16,380	22,939
1996	4,908	18,624	23,532
1995	3,130	17,573	20,703
1994	2,053	11,775	13,828
1993	2,034	7,509	9,543
1992	2,184	4,123	6,307
1991	2,127	2,908	5,035
1990	2,800	5,672	8,472

==== Asylum court statistics ====
===== Asylum court decisions by fiscal year =====
This table displays the number of Asylum court decisions by fiscal year along with the decision made. This is regardless of which immigration court or other information pertaining to the case. Table source:

Year	Decision			Total decisions
Year	Denied	Granted	Other relief	Total decisions
2025	60,438	22,181	1,213	83,832
2024	39,942	35,300	2,531	77,773
2023	35,988	36,039	2,740	74,767
2022	27,532	25,829	2,121	55,482
2021	15,166	9,965	1,462	26,593
2020	42,595	17,513	2,385	62,493
2019	20,871	46,775	1,425	69,051
2018	14,248	27,463	598	42,309
2017	11,995	10,893	345	30,288
2016	12,184	9,724	420	22,328
2015	9,215	9,042	345	18,602
2014	9,717	9,690	380	14,918
2013	9,437	11,055	459	20,951
2012	9,048	11,965	529	21,542
2011	9,959	11,495	611	22,065
2010	9,052	9,876	532	19,460
2009	10,718	10,268	618	21,604
2008	12,717	10,885	469	24,071
2007	14,397	12,856	487	27,740
2006	15,957	13,302	526	29,785
2005	18,537	11,711	499	30,747
2004	20,257	13,025	620	33,902
2003	21,868	13,379	536	35,783
2002	17,969	10,979	411	29,359
2001	14,633	10,007	399	25,039

===== Backlog of asylum court cases by fiscal year =====
This table shows the backlog or pending cases by fiscal year pertaining to asylum cases. This shows all asylum cases. Data from the source goes back to 2012. Table source:

Year	Backlog (# of cases)
2024	1,101,819
2023	1,009,625
2022	756,690
2021	667,229
2020	614,751
2019	489,003
2018	364,990
2017	259,871
2016	163,451
2015	136,145
2014	114,603
2013	108,398
2012	105,919

== Sources of immigration ==
=== Foreign born by decade ===
Region and country or area of birth of the foreign-born population, with geographic detail shown in decennial census
Region and country or area	2000	1990	1980	1970	1960	1930	1920	1910	1900	1890	1880	1870	1860	1850
Total	31,107,889	19,767,316	14,079,906	9,619,302	9,738,091	14,204,149	13,920,692	13,515,886	10,341,276	9,249,547	6,679,943	5,567,229	4,295,510	2,244,602
Reported by region and/or country	31,107,573	18,959,158	13,192,563	9,303,570	9,678,201	14,197,553	13,911,767	13,506,272	10,330,534	9,243,535	6,675,875	5,563,637	4,134,809	2,202,625
Europe	4,915,557	4,350,403	5,149,572	5,740,891	7,256,311	11,784,010	11,916,048	11,810,115	8,881,548	8,030,347	5,751,823	4,941,049	3,807,062	2,031,867
Northern and Western Europe	2,070,446	2,058,853	2,384,257	2,629,200	3,334,971	5,850,256	6,241,916	7,306,325	7,204,649	7,288,917	5,499,889	4,845,679	3,773,347	2,022,195
Northern Europe	974,619	968,271	1,083,499	1,271,591	1,694,430	3,415,551	3,501,149	3,953,947	3,917,815	4,056,160	3,212,431	2,867,926	2,271,661	1,358,887
British Isles	834,225	809,972	866,966	937,474	1,171,777	2,147,733	2,172,723	2,573,534	2,783,082	3,122,911	2,772,169	2,626,241	2,199,079	1,340,812
United Kingdom (total)	677,715	640,145	669,149	686,099	833,055	1,402,923	(X)	(X)	(X)	(X)	(X)	(X)	(X)	(X)
Great Britain (total)	677,751	623,614	649,318	645,262	764,893	1,224,091	1,135,489	1,221,283	1,167,623	1,251,402	917,598	770,414	587,775	379,093
England	423,609	405,588	442,499	458,114	528,205	809,563	813,853	877,719	840,513	908,141	662,676	550,924	431,692	278,675
Scotland	88,445	104,168	142,001	170,134	213,219	354,323	254,570	261,076	233,524	242,231	170,136	140,835	108,518	70,550
Wales	10,948	10,638	13,528	17,014	23,469	60,205	67,066	82,488	93,586	100,079	83,302	74,533	45,763	29,868
Great Britain n.e.c.	141,572	100,000	51,290	(NA)	(NA)	(NA)	(NA)	(NA)	(NA)	951	1,484	4,122	1,802	(NA)
Northern Ireland	13,177	16,531	19,831	40,837	68,162	178,832	(X)	(X)	(X)	(X)	(X)	(X)	(X)	(X)
Ireland	156,474	169,827	197,817	251,375	338,722	744,810	1,037,234	1,352,251	1,615,459	1,871,509	1,854,571	1,855,827	1,611,304	961,719
Scandinavia	140,394	158,299	216,533	334,117	522,653	1,267,818	1,328,426	1,380,413	1,134,733	933,249	440,262	241,685	72,582	18,075
Denmark	31,422	34,999	42,732	61,410	85,060	179,474	189,154	181,649	153,690	132,543	64,196	30,107	9,962	1,838
Finland	21,408	22,313	29,172	45,499	67,624	142,478	149,824	129,680	62,641	(NA)	(NA)	(NA)	(NA)	(NA)
Iceland	5,553	5,071	4,156	2,895	2,780	2,764	(NA)	(NA)	(NA)	(NA)	(NA)	(NA)	(NA)	(NA)
Norway	32,207	42,240	63,316	97,243	152,698	347,852	363,863	403,877	336,388	322,665	181,729	114,246	43,995	12,678
Sweden	49,724	53,676	77,157	127,070	214,491	595,250	625,585	665,207	582,014	478,041	194,337	97,332	18,625	3,559
Western Europe	1,095,847	1,090,582	1,300,758	1,357,609	1,640,541	2,434,705	2,740,767	3,352,378	3,286,834	3,232,757	2,287,458	1,977,753	1,501,686	663,308
Low Countries	130,615	132,617	142,748	155,513	173,069	206,375	207,038	172,534	127,719	107,349	86,461	65,157	37,353	11,161
Belgium	33,895	34,366	36,487	41,412	50,294	64,194	62,687	49,400	29,757	22,639	15,535	12,553	9,072	1,313
Luxembourg	2,150	2,053	3,125	3,531	4,360	9,048	12,585	3,071	3,031	2,882	12,836	5,802	(NA)	(NA)
Netherlands	94,570	96,198	103,136	110,570	118,415	133,133	131,766	120,063	94,931	81,828	58,090	46,802	28,281	9,848
Austria	63,648	87,673	145,607	214,014	304,507	370,914	575,627	626,341	275,907	123,271	38,663	30,508	25,061	946
France	151,154	119,233	120,215	105,385	111,582	135,592	153,072	117,418	104,197	113,174	106,971	116,402	109,870	54,069
Germany	706,704	711,929	849,384	832,965	989,815	1,608,814	1,686,108	2,311,237	2,663,418	2,784,894	1,966,742	1,690,533	1,276,075	583,774
Switzerland	43,106	39,130	42,804	49,732	61,568	113,010	118,659	124,848	115,593	104,069	88,621	75,153	53,327	13,358
Other Western Europe	(NA)	(NA)	(NA)	(NA)	(NA)	(NA)	263	(NA)	(NA)	(NA)	(NA)	(NA)	(NA)	(NA)
Southern and Eastern Europe	2,840,721	2,285,513	2,748,547	3,090,991	3,907,020	5,918,982	5,670,927	4,500,932	1,674,648	728,851	248,620	93,824	32,312	9,672
Southern Europe	934,665	1,054,141	1,336,805	1,363,195	1,541,441	2,133,092	1,939,600	1,544,149	539,968	216,387	66,249	30,416	21,726	8,152
Greece	165,750	177,398	210,998	177,275	159,167	174,526	175,976	101,282	8,515	1,887	776	390	328	86
Italy	473,338	580,592	831,922	1,008,533	1,256,999	1,790,429	1,610,113	1,343,125	484,027	182,580	44,230	17,157	11,677	3,679
Portugal (total)	203,119	210,122	209,968	119,899	80,276	108,775	103,976	77,634	40,376	25,735	15,650	8,973	5,477	1,274
Azores	26,559	29,656	32,531	28,865	22,586	35,611	33,995	18,274	9,768	9,739	7,512	4,431	1,361	(NA)
Portugal (main)	175,571	180,466	177,437	91,034	57,690	73,164	69,981	59,360	30,608	15,996	8,138	4,542	4,116	1,274
Spain	82,858	76,415	73,735	57,488	44,999	59,362	49,535	22,108	7,050	6,185	5,121	3,764	4,244	3,113
Other Southern Europe	(NA)	9,614	10,182	(NA)	(NA)	(NA)	(NA)	(NA)	(NA)	(NA)	472	132	(NA)	(NA)
Eastern Europe	1,906,056	1,231,372	1,411,742	1,727,796	2,365,579	3,785,890	3,731,327	2,956,783	1,134,680	512,464	182,371	63,408	10,586	1,520
Albania	38,663	5,627	7,381	9,180	9,618	8,814	5,608	(NA)	(NA)	(NA)	(NA)	(NA)	(NA)	(NA)
Bulgaria	35,090	8,579	8,463	8,609	8,223	9,399	10,477	11,498	(NA)	(NA)	(NA)	(NA)	(NA)	(NA)
Czechoslovakia (former)	83,081	87,020	112,707	160,899	227,618	491,638	362,438	219,214	156,891	118,106	85,361	40,289	(NA)	(NA)
Estonia	9,785	9,210	12,169	12,163	13,991	3,550	(NA)	(NA)	(NA)	(NA)	(NA)	(NA)	(NA)	(NA)
Hungary	92,071	110,337	144,368	183,236	245,252	274,450	397,283	495,609	145,714	62,435	11,526	3,737	(NA)	(NA)
Latvia	27,232	26,179	34,349	41,707	50,681	20,673	(NA)	(NA)	(NA)	(NA)	(NA)	(NA)	(NA)	(NA)
Lithuania	28,490	29,745	48,194	76,001	121,475	193,606	135,068	(NA)	(NA)	(NA)	(NA)	(NA)	(NA)	(NA)
Poland	466,742	388,328	418,128	548,107	747,750	1,268,583	1,139,979	937,884	383,407	147,440	48,557	14,436	7,298	(NA)
Romania	135,966	91,106	66,994	70,687	84,575	146,393	102,823	65,923	15,032	(NA)	(NA)	(NA)	(NA)	(NA)
Soviet Union (former, total)	838,809	333,725	406,022	463,462	690,598	1,153,628	1,400,495	1,184,412	423,726	182,644	35,722	4,644	3,160	1,414
Turkey in Europe	(NA)	(NA)	(NA)	(NA)	(NA)	2,257	5,284	32,230	9,910	1,839	1,205	302	128	106
Yugoslavia (former, total)	278,314	141,516	152,967	153,745	165,798	211,416	169,439	(NA)	(NA)	(NA)	(NA)	(NA)	(NA)	(NA)
Other Eastern Europe	(NA)	(NA)	(NA)	(NA)	(NA)	1,483	2,433	10,013	(NA)	(NA)	(NA)	(NA)	(NA)	(NA)
Europe n.e.c.	4,370	6,037	16,768	20,700	14,320	14,772	3,205	2,858	2,251	12,579	3,314	1,546	1,403	(NA)
Asia	8,226,254	4,979,037	2,539,777	824,887	490,996	275,665	237,950	191,484	120,248	113,383	107,630	64,565	36,796	1,135
Armenia	65,280	(X)	(X)	(X)	(X)	32,166	36,628	(NA)	(NA)	(NA)	(NA)	(NA)	(NA)	(NA)
China	988,857	529,837	286,120	172,132	99,735	46,129	43,560	56,756	81,534	106,688	104,468	63,042	35,565	758
India	1,022,552	450,406	206,087	51,000	12,296	5,850	4,901	4,664	2,031	2,143	1,707	586	(NA)	(NA)
Japan	347,539	290,128	221,794	120,235	109,175	70,993	81,502	67,744	24,788	2,292	401	73	(NA)	(NA)
Israel	(NA)	21,070	(NA)	(NA)	(NA)	6,137	3,203	(NA)	(NA)	(NA)	(NA)	(NA)	(NA)	(NA)
Syria	54,561	36,782	22,081	14,962	16,717	57,227	51,901	(NA)	(NA)	(NA)	(NA)	(NA)	(NA)	(NA)
Turkey in Asia	78,378	55,087	51,915	48,085	52,228	46,654	11,019	59,729	(NA)	(NA)	(NA)	(NA)	(NA)	(NA)
Other Asia	(NA)	3,595,727	1,751,780	418,473	200,845	10,509	5,236	2,591	11,895	2,260	1,054	864	1,231	377
Africa	881,300	363,819	199,723	80,143	35,355	18,326	16,126	3,992	2,538	2,207	2,204	2,657	526	551
Africa excl. Atlantic Islands	(NA)	349,451	189,266	61,463	27,053	8,859	5,781	3,992	2,538	2,207	2,204	2,657	526	551
Atlantic Islands	(NA)	14,368	10,457	18,680	8,302	9,467	10,345	(NA)	(NA)	(NA)	(NA)	(NA)	(NA)	(NA)
Oceania	168,046	104,145	77,577	41,258	34,730	17,343	14,626	11,450	8,820	9,353	6,859	4,028	2,140	588
Australia	60,965	42,267	36,120	24,271	22,209	12,816	10,914	9,035	6,807	5,984	4,906	3,118	1,419	(NA)
Sandwich Islands (Hawaii)	(X)	(X)	(X)	(X)	(X)	(X)	(X)	(X)	(X)	1,304	1,147	584	435	588
Other Oceania	61,878	41,457	16,987	12,521	4,527	3,712	2,415	2,013	2,065	806	326	286	(NA)	
Latin America	16,086,974	8,407,837	4,372,487	1,803,970	908,309	791,840	588,843	279,514	137,458	107,307	90,073	57,871	38,315	20,773
Caribbean	2,953,066	1,938,348	1,258,363	675,108	193,922	106,241	78,962	47,635	25,435	23,256	16,401	11,570	7,353	5,772
Cuba	872,716	736,971	607,814	439,048	79,150	18,493	14,872	15,133	11,081	(NA)	6,917	5,319	(NA)	(NA)
Other Caribbean	(NA)	1,201,377	650,549	236,060	114,772	87,748	64,090	32,502	14,354	(NA)	9,484	6,251	(NA)	(NA)
Central America	11,203,673	5,431,992	2,553,113	873,624	624,851	651,976	491,330	223,651	107,290	79,045	69,106	42,736	27,699	13,458
Mexico	9,177,487	4,298,014	2,199,221	759,711	575,902	641,462	486,418	221,915	103,393	77,853	68,399	42,435	27,466	13,317
Other Central America	2,026,150	1,133,978	353,892	113,913	48,949	10,514	4,912	1,736	3,897	1,192	707	301	233	141
South America	1,930,271	1,037,497	561,011	255,238	89,536	33,623	18,551	8,228	4,733	5,006	4,566	3,565	3,263	1,543
Northern America	829,442	753,917	853,427	812,421	952,500	1,310,369	1,138,174	1,209,717	1,179,922	980,938	717,286	493,467	249,970	147,711
Canada	820,771	744,830	842,859	812,421	952,500	1,310,369	1,138,174	1,209,717	1,179,922	980,938	717,157	493,464	249,970	147,711
Canada-French	(NA)	(NA)	(NA)	(NA)	(NA)	370,852	307,786	385,083	395,126	302,496	(NA)	(NA)	(NA)	(NA)
Canada-Other	(NA)	(NA)	(NA)	(NA)	(NA)	915,537	817,139	819,554	784,796	678,442	(NA)	(NA)	(NA)	(NA)
Newfoundland	(NA)	(NA)	(NA)	(NA)	(NA)	23,980	13,249	5,080	(NA)	(NA)	(NA)	(NA)	(NA)	(NA)
Other Northern America	8,671	9,087	10,568	(NA)	(NA)	(NA)	(NA)	(NA)	(NA)	(NA)	129	3	(NA)	(NA)
Region or country not reported	316	808,158	887,343	315,732	59,890	6,596	8,925	9,614	10,742	6,012	4,068	3,592	3,888	41,977
Born at sea	(NA)	(NA)	(NA)	(NA)	(NA)	5,008	5,336	6,927	8,196	5,533	4,068	2,638	2,522	(NA)
Not reported	(NA)	(NA)	(NA)	(NA)	(NA)	1,588	3,589	2,687	2,546	479	(NA)	954	1,366	41,977

(NA) Not available.
n.e.c. Not elsewhere classified.
1/ Prior to 1980, Taiwan included with China.

=== Persons obtaining lawful permanent resident status by country of last residence ===
==== 21st-century ====
===== 2020s =====
Persons obtaining lawful permanent resident status by region and selected country of last residence
Country of birth	2020–2024	2020	2021	2022	2023	2024
Mexico	729,470	100,330	107,230	138,770	180,530	202,600
India	411,890	46,360	93,450	127,010	78,070	66,800
Cuba	341,690	16,370	23,080	36,640	81,600	184,040
China	290,510	41,480	49,850	67,950	59,260	71,470
Dominican Republic	234,220	30,010	24,550	40,150	68,870	69,630
Philippines	187,020	25,490	27,510	36,000	49,200	48,820
Vietnam	146,820	30,000	16,310	24,430	36,000	39,080
El Salvador	124,780	17,910	18,670	30,880	26,210	31,110
Brazil	116,740	16,750	18,350	24,170	28,880	28,490
Afghanistan	105,700	11,410	9,490	14,190	30,300	50,310
Jamaica	92,800	12,830	13,360	16,480	21,460	28,670
Venezuela	84,510	12,140	14,410	21,030	18,440	18,490
South Korea	76,230	16,240	12,350	16,170	15,770	15,100
Colombia	74,150	11,990	15,290	21,720	24,810	30,140
Nigeria	73,050	12,400	13,100	12,390	15,790	19,610
Guatemala	67,700	7,820	8,900	16,990	15,690	17,300
Honduras	66,890	8,280	10,120	17,100	14,140	17,250
Pakistan	64,360	10,470	9,690	11,780	11,110	23,310
Bangladesh	62,050	9,270	6,410	10,860	18,910	16,600
Haiti	57,080	9,340	11,460	10,430	15,450	10,800
Canada	53,320	9,530	9,980	11,320	11,870	11,620
Nepal	50,950	7,850	7,310	12,010	11,930	12,850
Ukraine	49,370	9,890	7,580	11,620	11,250	9,030
Peru	49,250	5,630	5,040	8,040	12,580	12,960
Ecuador	48,800	6,160	7,530	11,910	11,300	13,800
United Kingdom	46,770	9,660	9,230	9,140	9,720	9,020
Iran	45,040	8,810	5,730	9,410	11,450	10,050
Russia	44,700	7,970	5,530	8,910	11,570	10,720
Egypt	38,480	6,160	4,400	8,350	10,190	9,420
Ethiopia	32,120	6,280	3,710	5,720	6,510	9,900
Ghana	31,840	4,630	3,940	5,450	6,910	10,870
Turkey	31,190	4,360	4,470	7,000	7,330	8,030
Yemen	28,540	5,910	4,350	5,650	5,580	6,050
Kenya	26,110	4,030	3,090	5,010	5,080	8,900
Democratic Republic of the Congo	26,040	7,520	3,910	4,690	4,880	5,040
Jordan	24,820	3,060	3,420	4,780	7,140	6,420
Taiwan	24,360	4,760	4,250	5,090	5,300	5,020
Cameroon	24,320	2,840	3,580	5,880	6,010	5,990
Thailand	23,470	4,180	4,040	4,630	5,230	5,390
Morocco	23,250	2,870	3,820	4,760	6,170	5,630
Albania	22,340	3,510	2,610	5,950	5,160	5,080
Argentina	21,110	2,970	3,250	4,130	5,050	5,710
Germany	20,580	3,910	3,900	4,090	4,550	4,130
Guyana	20,400	3,030	3,440	3,460	5,860	4,610
France	19,950	4,050	4,110	4,350	4,480	3,660
Japan	19,840	3,910	3,960	4,180	4,060	3,740
Nicaragua	18,600	2,570	4,220	3,750	3,870	4,180
Israel	17,680	3,690	3,100	3,440	3,650	3,800
Syria	17,450	3,180	1,750	3,250	3,680	5,590
South Africa	16,720	2,730	2,720	3,540	3,850	3,880
Myanmar	16,430	4,000	2,140	2,880	3,970	3,440
Armenia	16,280	2,150	1,830	3,040	4,720	4,540
Poland	16,280	3,340	2,970	3,190	3,170	3,610
Algeria	15,770	1,580	1,900	3,130	5,150	3,900
Italy	15,370	3,180	3,070	3,480	3,470	3,170
Lebanon	15,250	2,120	2,250	3,430	3,650	4,740
Iraq	14,800	2,270	1,730	2,800	3,960	4,040
Spain	14,300	2,620	2,640	2,870	3,350	2,820
Uzbekistan	13,940	1,350	990	4,980	5,550	5,070
Australia	13,370	2,520	2,680	2,860	2,790	2,520
Liberia	12,340	1,670	2,500	2,410	2,590	3,170
Sudan	11,810	1,870	870	1,370	3,340	3,880
Trinidad and Tobago	11,420	1,720	1,850	2,440	2,590	2,830
Cambodia	11,250	1,590	1,760	3,400	2,470	2,930
Costa Rica	11,230	1,660	1,990	2,170	2,490	2,740
Saudi Arabia	11,170	1,850	1,780	2,760	3,040	2,700
Georgia	9,880	1,180	1,240	2,300	2,690	2,470
Sri Lanka	9,820	1,460	1,230	2,570	2,270	2,290
Hong Kong	9,650	1,780	1,330	2,300	2,290	1,950
Romania	9,450	1,990	1,850	1,830	1,860	1,890
Chile	9,440	1,520	1,630	1,750	2,200	2,540
Belarus	9,350	1,720	1,440	2,170	2,600	2,420
Kazakhstan	9,220	1,310	1,330	1,790	2,900	2,490
Tanzania	9,060	2,310	1,440	1,640	1,820	1,850
Togo	8,740	1,280	1,140	1,890	2,100	2,330
Uganda	8,700	1,800	1,150	1,620	1,660	2,090
Malaysia	8,570	1,900	1,610	1,570	1,700	1,640
Indonesia	8,470	1,430	1,590	1,750	1,930	1,970
Kyrgyzstan	8,130	590	710	1,640	2,680	2,510
Eritrea	7,990	1,880	1,300	1,760	1,520	1,530
United Arab Emirates	7,970	1,250	1,330	1,960	1,840	1,590
Sierra Leone	7,830	710	1,230	2,320	1,870	1,680
Bolivia	7,370	980	1,120	1,620	1,580	2,070
Cape Verde	7,270	1,000	940	1,120	1,860	2,350
Somalia	7,080	2,020	960	1,040	1,230	2,030
Moldova	7,070	1,370	1,050	1,500	1,540	1,610
Ivory Coast	6,880	1,050	1,210	1,560	1,700	1,360
Rwanda	6,750	1,080	780	1,540	1,850	1,500
Ireland	6,730	1,470	1,360	1,370	1,340	1,190
Senegal	6,310	1,000	960	1,250	1,400	1,700
Tajikistan	6,240	520	540	950	2,090	2,140
Unknown	6,220	630	1,010	1,390	730	2,430
Soviet Union	6,150	1,070	1,080	1,240	1,440	1,320
Zimbabwe	5,960	670	740	1,430	1,310	1,810
Guinea	5,880	860	750	1,370	1,540	1,360
Bulgaria	5,200	1,120	1,000	1,150	960	970
Netherlands	5,150	960	1,010	970	1,210	1,000
Azerbaijan	5,100	810	550	1,130	1,370	1,340
Kuwait	5,020	770	920	1,120	1,170	1,030
Gambia	4,830	660	780	1,010	1,080	1,300
Greece	4,790	950	840	920	1,020	1,060
Panama	4,530	600	840	950	1,010	1,130
Burundi	4,430	1,100	730	790	840	970
Singapore	4,320	810	800	970	880	770
Uruguay	4,220	700	830	730	870	1,090
Bahamas	4,200	610	1,000	770	870	950
Mongolia	4,140	540	760	1,010	810	1,030
Fiji	4,100	430	420	1,120	960	1,170
Serbia	4,050	1,080	810	640	690	830
Sweden	3,970	840	790	750	820	770
Hungary	3,890	760	730	840	810	850
Kosovo	3,850	680	560	850	1,040	720
Portugal	3,850	680	750	750	890	780
Laos	3,570	490	350	620	730	1,000
Burkina Faso	3,340	470	550	810	810	720
New Zealand	3,330	610	670	650	720	670
Benin	3,290	450	470	720	710	940
Belize	3,280	480	670	590	700	840
Libya	3,240	510	410	710	920	590
North Macedonia	3,200	590	750	980	920	880
Belgium	2,990	630	600	550	670	540
Switzerland	2,910	590	610	610	620	500
Tunisia	2,910	460	510	570	660	710
Turkmenistan	2,810	250	160	940	720	670
Saint Lucia	2,720	460	460	630	560	610
Lithuania	2,700	480	490	510	530	600
Czech Republic	2,570	450	500	470	530	520
Zambia	2,440	400	360	370	480	610
Bosnia and Herzegovina	2,430	480	480	510	460	470
Mali	2,310	390	380	480	540	520
Paraguay	2,310	260	360	380	450	660
Qatar	2,200	220	320	430	660	570
Serbia and Montenegro(former)	2,090	150	400	540	540	460
Republic of the Congo	2,060	310	220	530	470	440
Grenada	1,990	310	370	450	450	430
Angola	1,930	180	210	450	570	510
Bhutan	1,830	1,090	140	210	210	180
Denmark	1,830	410	320	370	430	300
Dominica	1,820	290	280	460	390	400
Austria	1,780	310	360	340	380	390
Montenegro	1,670	300	270	320	340	440
Slovakia	1,650	340	310	320	330	350
Finland	1,590	320	320	290	320	340
Norway	1,410	250	230	280	310	340
Barbados	1,390	230	270	310	300	280
Croatia	1,280	240	290	260	250	240
Saint Vincent and the Grenadines	1,270	200	230	320	260	260
Latvia	1,210	220	260	250	240	240
Antigua and Barbuda	1,190	190	200	280	250	270
United States	1,180	190	260	290	220	220
Tonga	1,140	200	170	210	250	310
Mauritania	1,090	130	140	330	390	250
Malawi	1,050	200	170	180	200	300
Niger	970	140	180	200	200	250
Chad	880	110	100	170	270	230
Oman	870	120	150	210	210	170
Samoa	820	150	130	140	170	230
Bahrain	800	130	150	160	200	160
Saint Kitts and Nevis	720	110	110	140	150	190
Central African Republic	690	150	150	140	110	140
Gabon	680	90	120	130	160	180
Djibouti	670	80	110	150	160	170
Estonia	650	130	140	120	140	130
Suriname	650	120	120	110	140	160
South Sudan	560	120	70	100	100	170
Cyprus	510	110	100	90	110	100
Slovenia	430	80	90	90	100	70
Madagascar	420	80	80	100	80	80
Namibia	420	90	80	50	100	100
Bermuda	370	70	70	70	80	80
Iceland	370	80	80	70	60	70
Mauritius	370	70	70	90	60	80
Macau	340	60	50	60	90	80
Mozambique	320	60	50	70	70	70
Botswana	290	40	60	60	50	80
Czechoslovakia(former)	290	70	50	60	60	40
Cayman Islands	270	50	60	40	50	70
Equatorial Guinea	240	30	30	50	60	70
Turks and Caicos Islands	230	30	50	50	50	50
Virgin Islands, British	220	30	40	50	40	50
All other countries	210	30	30	50	50	50
Aruba	190	20	30	50	40	50
Curaçao	190	30	30	40	40	50
Guinea-Bissau	190	30	20	40	50	50
Luxembourg	180	20	30	30	60	40
Malta	170	40	20	30	40	40
Sint Maarten	170	20	20	40	50	40
Papua New Guinea	150	20	20	30	40	40
Eswatini	140	30	30	20	20	40
French Polynesia	130	20	10	50	20	30
North Korea	130	30	20	20	20	40
Brunei	110	10	20	20	30	30
Federated States of Micronesia	80	20	10	20	20	10
Anguilla	70	10	10	20	20	20
Maldives	70	0	0	10	40	20
Lesotho	60	10	10	10	20	10
Marshall Islands	60	10	10	20	10	10
Montserrat	50	10	10	10	10	10
Netherlands Antilles	50	10	10	10	10	10
Palau	50	10	10	10	10	10
Saint Martin	50	0	10	20	10	10
Monaco	40	10	10	10	10	0
Sao Tome and Principe	40	0	0	20	10	10
Seychelles	30	0	0	10	10	10
Comoros	20	0	0	0	10	10
Nauru	20	10	0	0	10	0
Total	5,002,660	707,360	740,000	1,018,350	1,172,910	1,364,090

===== 2010s =====
Immigrant arrivals by region and country of birth (2010–2019)
1. Mexico (14.3%)
2. China (6.99%)
3. India (6.15%)
4. Philippines (4.98%)
5. Dominican Republic (4.75%)
6. Cuba (4.57%)
7. Vietnam (3.15%)
8. El Salvador (2.02%)
9. Haiti (1.92%)
10. Other (51.2%)

Persons obtaining lawful permanent resident status by region and selected country of last residence
Region and country of birth	2010–2019	2010	2011	2012	2013	2014	2015	2016	2017	2018	2019
Mexico	1,519,696	139,120	143,446	146,406	135,028	134,052	158,619	174,534	170,581	161,858	156,052
China	742,907	70,863	87,016	81,784	71,798	76,089	74,558	81,772	71,565	65,214	62,248
India	654,488	69,162	69,013	66,434	68,458	77,908	64,116	64,687	60,394	59,821	54,495
Philippines	529,043	58,173	57,011	57,327	54,446	49,996	56,478	53,287	49,147	47,258	45,920
Dominican Republic	505,048	53,870	46,109	41,566	41,311	44,577	50,610	61,161	58,520	57,413	49,911
Cuba	485,810	33,573	36,452	32,820	32,219	46,679	54,396	66,516	65,028	76,486	41,641
Vietnam	334,537	30,632	34,157	28,304	27,101	30,283	30,832	41,451	38,231	33,834	39,712
El Salvador	215,289	18,806	18,667	16,256	18,260	19,273	19,487	23,449	25,109	28,326	27,656
Haiti	204,124	22,582	22,111	22,818	20,351	15,274	16,967	23,584	21,824	21,360	17,253
Korea, South	203,774	22,227	22,824	20,846	23,166	20,423	17,138	21,801	19,194	17,676	18,479
Jamaica	203,551	19,825	19,662	20,705	19,400	19,026	17,642	23,350	21,905	20,347	21,689
Colombia	196,546	22,406	22,635	20,931	21,131	18,175	17,316	18,610	17,956	17,545	19,841
Iraq	165,141	19,855	21,133	20,369	9,552	19,153	21,107	18,904	14,203	14,351	6,514
Pakistan	164,908	18,258	15,546	14,740	13,251	18,612	18,057	19,313	17,408	15,802	13,921
Bangladesh	150,854	14,819	16,707	14,705	12,099	14,645	13,570	18,723	14,693	15,717	15,176
Nigeria	134,744	13,376	11,824	13,575	13,840	12,828	11,542	14,380	13,539	13,952	15,888
Brazil	132,368	12,258	11,763	11,441	11,033	10,429	11,424	13,812	14,989	15,394	19,825
Ethiopia	128,726	14,266	13,793	14,544	13,097	12,300	11,394	13,232	14,637	12,403	9,060
Iran	123,357	14,182	14,822	12,916	12,863	11,615	13,114	13,298	13,791	10,116	6,640
Burma	122,511	12,925	16,518	17,383	12,565	11,144	12,808	13,065	12,897	8,182	5,024
Canada	122,063	13,328	12,800	12,932	13,181	11,586	12,673	12,793	11,484	9,898	11,388
Guatemala	119,426	10,467	11,092	10,341	10,224	10,238	11,773	13,002	13,198	15,638	13,453
United Kingdom	119,045	12,792	11,572	12,014	12,984	12,225	12,592	12,673	10,948	9,908	11,337
Peru	115,220	14,247	14,064	12,609	12,564	10,606	10,148	10,940	10,115	9,878	10,049
Nepal	113,537	7,115	10,166	11,312	13,046	12,357	12,926	12,851	11,610	11,953	10,201
Ecuador	107,581	11,492	11,103	9,342	10,591	10,960	10,187	10,757	10,594	11,472	11,083
Venezuela	105,185	9,409	9,183	9,387	9,572	8,427	9,144	10,772	11,809	11,762	15,720
Egypt	100,784	8,978	7,778	8,988	10,294	11,477	12,085	12,045	9,834	9,826	9,479
Honduras	100,177	6,448	6,133	6,884	8,898	8,156	9,274	13,302	11,387	13,794	15,901
Ukraine	92,541	8,477	8,292	7,642	8,193	7,752	7,987	10,422	10,135	11,879	11,762
Russia	88,920	6,718	7,944	9,969	9,753	9,079	8,799	9,297	8,918	8,621	9,822
Ghana	82,709	7,429	8,798	10,592	10,265	7,115	6,186	6,949	8,455	8,394	8,526
Afghanistan	81,455	2,017	1,648	1,617	2,196	10,527	8,328	12,513	19,538	12,935	10,136
Thailand	74,544	9,384	9,962	9,459	7,583	6,197	7,502	7,039	6,311	5,556	5,551
Kenya	67,308	7,421	7,762	7,043	6,123	5,884	5,602	6,274	6,957	7,190	7,052
Bhutan	59,969	6,109	10,137	10,198	8,954	7,298	6,325	4,217	2,940	2,350	1,441
Guyana	58,527	6,749	6,599	5,683	5,897	6,267	5,543	5,771	5,468	5,165	5,385
Poland	57,705	7,643	6,863	6,300	6,430	5,689	5,275	5,603	4,845	4,357	4,700
Somalia	55,634	4,558	4,451	5,204	3,764	5,190	6,796	6,958	7,404	7,557	3,752
Germany	55,136	6,888	6,125	5,812	6,032	5,584	5,436	5,306	4,662	4,443	4,848
Democratic Republic of Congo	54,843	1,764	2,424	3,731	2,792	4,347	5,345	6,791	8,709	9,941	8,999
Taiwan	54,045	6,732	6,154	5,331	5,385	4,697	4,888	5,120	4,858	5,079	5,801
Japan	54,013	6,264	6,161	6,061	5,925	5,545	5,395	5,207	4,635	4,317	4,503
Syria	50,430	2,555	2,785	3,014	3,366	3,540	3,840	4,800	5,877	14,686	5,967
Jordan	46,735	3,868	3,876	4,099	4,188	5,187	4,664	5,269	5,264	5,322	4,998
Turkey	45,838	4,483	4,403	4,162	4,144	3,834	4,201	4,469	4,844	5,585	5,713
Albania	45,264	4,711	3,612	3,364	3,186	3,828	4,653	5,773	5,722	5,049	5,366
Yemen	44,461	3,591	3,361	2,620	3,532	3,492	3,194	13,040	6,029	1,885	3,717
France	43,840	3,919	3,653	3,862	4,425	4,284	4,693	5,159	4,782	4,276	4,787
Uzbekistan	43,721	4,770	5,056	4,726	4,382	5,194	3,977	4,359	4,095	4,612	2,550
Cameroon	43,127	4,161	4,754	3,815	3,908	3,943	4,374	4,899	4,668	4,236	4,369
Israel	40,214	4,515	3,826	4,153	3,996	3,805	3,965	4,142	3,802	3,706	4,304
Trinidad and Tobago	40,073	5,435	5,023	5,214	4,724	3,988	3,212	3,469	3,100	2,758	3,150
Argentina	39,785	4,399	4,473	4,359	4,372	3,874	3,730	4,091	3,482	3,080	3,925
Morocco	39,332	5,013	4,399	3,656	3,336	3,605	3,710	4,586	4,229	3,077	3,721
Liberia	38,470	4,837	4,151	4,109	3,334	3,874	3,795	3,619	4,155	3,101	3,495
Romania	33,599	4,003	3,882	3,748	3,773	3,246	3,376	3,554	2,953	2,448	2,616
Nicaragua	32,707	3,565	3,401	3,046	3,048	2,886	3,324	3,486	3,072	3,061	3,818
Italy	32,381	2,579	2,443	2,673	2,960	3,298	3,544	4,078	3,655	3,329	3,822
Armenia	30,538	2,979	2,983	2,681	2,722	2,913	2,962	3,543	3,437	3,217	3,101
Lebanon	29,477	3,487	3,295	2,879	2,783	3,245	2,813	2,971	2,818	2,581	2,605
Sudan	28,744	2,397	2,628	2,471	1,945	2,442	3,580	3,159	3,515	3,658	2,949
South Africa	28,519	2,758	2,649	2,781	2,629	2,676	2,907	3,023	2,912	3,010	3,174
Cambodia	28,396	2,986	2,745	2,473	2,624	2,536	1,868	3,173	4,056	3,187	2,748
Australia	27,914	2,512	2,343	2,414	2,759	2,809	3,034	3,239	2,906	2,693	3,205
Malaysia	27,285	1,714	2,273	2,605	2,477	2,622	2,749	3,382	4,109	3,051	2,303
Spain	26,647	1,684	1,890	1,842	2,480	2,928	3,303	3,519	3,045	2,841	3,115
Bulgaria	24,595	2,570	2,661	2,440	2,844	2,981	2,688	2,670	2,184	1,798	1,759
Indonesia	23,143	3,032	2,856	2,603	2,731	2,139	2,084	2,129	1,914	1,756	1,899
Moldova	23,132	1,981	2,258	2,021	2,485	2,341	2,496	2,929	2,480	2,206	1,935
Hong Kong	22,452	2,432	2,306	2,104	2,226	2,278	2,085	2,510	2,415	2,075	2,021
Eritrea	22,290	1,656	2,102	2,643	2,138	2,002	2,220	2,267	2,449	2,428	2,385
Costa Rica	21,355	2,164	2,135	2,020	2,114	1,966	2,029	2,224	2,184	2,171	2,348
Belarus	19,900	2,038	1,964	1,659	1,970	2,015	1,994	2,127	1,919	1,951	2,263
Soviet Union	18,613	4,978	3,687	1,296	1,264	1,136	1,022	1,042	939	1,022	1,227
Sri Lanka	18,283	2,036	2,053	1,994	1,847	1,767	1,763	1,913	1,627	1,594	1,689
Bolivia	17,943	2,253	2,173	1,948	2,071	1,719	1,626	1,595	1,510	1,523	1,525
Cabo Verde	17,881	1,668	1,808	1,684	1,673	1,154	1,253	2,242	2,618	1,929	1,852
Saudi Arabia	17,771	1,263	1,396	1,343	1,463	1,696	1,744	2,117	2,135	2,100	2,514
Algeria	17,464	1,305	1,364	1,369	1,241	1,669	1,775	2,180	2,139	2,123	2,299
Sierra Leone	17,237	2,011	1,985	1,688	1,651	1,740	1,599	1,535	2,058	1,527	1,443
Chile	16,993	1,950	1,853	1,673	1,736	1,581	1,596	1,698	1,625	1,519	1,762
Uganda	16,606	1,085	1,239	1,340	1,350	1,409	1,664	1,649	1,898	2,412	2,560
Togo	15,831	1,563	1,506	1,756	1,257	1,612	1,547	1,938	1,572	1,534	1,546
Tanzania	15,734	1,850	1,427	1,516	837	774	799	788	1,415	3,186	3,142
Ireland	15,635	1,507	1,371	1,514	1,626	1,605	1,607	1,759	1,485	1,401	1,760
Cote d'Ivoire	15,534	1,621	1,302	1,760	1,486	1,477	1,497	1,617	1,810	1,375	1,589
Georgia	14,965	1,518	1,490	1,341	1,368	1,240	1,410	1,635	1,629	1,643	1,691
Guinea	14,582	1,379	1,555	1,656	1,518	1,375	1,389	1,501	1,348	1,282	1,579
Unknown	14,358	1,330	1,245	1,206	3,263	1,150	677	1,724	1,468	1,151	1,144
Senegal	14,269	1,285	1,424	1,615	1,340	1,273	1,244	1,533	1,470	1,420	1,665
Kazakhstan	12,981	1,282	1,235	1,202	1,241	1,221	1,201	1,310	1,377	1,378	1,533
Greece	11,885	745	949	1,054	1,361	1,235	1,211	1,451	1,314	1,214	1,350
Uruguay	11,858	1,331	1,553	1,374	1,352	1,128	1,078	972	1,001	960	1,109
Netherlands	11,790	1,321	1,085	1,091	1,142	1,195	1,309	1,319	1,056	998	1,274
Panama	11,446	1,536	1,374	1,281	1,234	1,095	1,052	1,029	889	897	1,059
United Arab Emirates	11,131	779	707	854	910	1,039	1,193	1,370	1,314	1,379	1,586
Gambia	11,043	859	972	1,159	1,018	1,111	1,142	1,247	1,134	1,023	1,378
Kuwait	10,757	1,037	973	1,044	937	1,057	1,055	1,186	1,177	1,090	1,201
North Macedonia	10,312	963	1,078	906	895	960	1,060	1,262	1,027	1,082	1,079
Hungary	10,270	1,022	1,044	1,054	1,052	996	1,095	1,048	972	917	1,070
Sweden	10,171	1,097	979	968	1,106	954	1,066	1,144	950	889	1,018
Serbia	9,765	20	244	704	866	1,143	1,278	1,351	1,410	1,217	1,532
Rwanda	9,308	489	520	592	540	555	732	1,357	1,394	1,620	1,509
Laos	9,005	1,200	956	949	923	806	917	856	685	863	850
Zimbabwe	8,836	1,274	1,016	914	924	797	779	815	810	749	758
Portugal	8,828	755	821	811	918	892	857	1,006	939	889	940
Fiji	8,802	1,201	1,041	853	895	802	875	866	805	730	734
New Zealand	8,315	919	803	814	921	796	855	846	798	719	844
Belize	8,259	965	905	847	946	789	772	851	746	632	806
Congo, Republic	8,220	968	1,371	1,461	1,059	552	496	625	632	580	476
Kosovo	8,158	355	670	782	839	758	814	1,020	1,014	886	1,020
Bosnia and Herzegovina	8,024	946	878	815	697	693	859	971	846	682	637
Saint Lucia	7,988	872	785	919	853	844	739	777	777	696	726
Lithuania	7,984	985	936	924	854	747	750	735	645	658	750
Singapore	7,820	774	690	712	835	779	781	812	818	801	818
Kyrgyzstan	7,197	507	542	648	652	707	790	847	715	908	881
Bahamas	7,010	652	668	619	630	654	725	656	725	759	922
Azerbaijan	7,006	781	728	663	637	672	676	784	881	1,015	1,169
Mongolia	6,895	594	774	691	729	651	644	750	661	636	765
Switzerland	6,391	675	615	635	697	656	640	743	565	570	595
Belgium	6,269	592	567	574	675	632	662	691	625	537	714
Serbia and Montenegro	6,164	2,196	1,398	801	653	267	232	202	144	132	139
Tajikistan	6,049	299	382	411	550	516	595	593	652	893	1,158
Mali	5,965	528	629	734	667	604	587	598	544	488	586
Grenada	5,943	664	579	671	687	633	525	585	544	501	554
Burundi	5,905	841	593	535	260	273	351	415	1,094	762	781
Czechia	5,569	190	303	677	676	606	637	650	582	534	714
Burkina Faso	5,465	377	433	558	585	583	575	642	541	525	646
Zambia	5,341	628	652	643	505	441	460	487	537	477	511
Benin	5,105	486	462	415	342	517	466	577	648	573	619
Libya	5,093	355	357	315	376	524	734	642	780	499	511
Denmark	4,816	518	459	459	506	514	609	521	461	353	416
Tunisia	4,752	418	440	422	445	429	518	518	535	517	510
Slovakia	4,714	538	594	528	507	460	424	483	388	370	422
Saint Vincent and the Grenadines	4,458	576	468	503	529	448	415	422	361	333	403
Paraguay	4,321	467	500	467	448	391	382	434	391	389	452
Austria	4,257	442	424	407	415	438	474	432	387	401	437
Finland	4,063	397	363	348	331	350	407	489	439	442	497
Latvia	4,010	435	426	436	424	384	480	391	359	356	319
Barbados	3,968	465	455	460	428	384	376	371	373	318	338
Croatia	3,449	357	349	336	353	297	348	388	375	286	360
Dominica	3,407	366	287	125	244	345	229	298	510	492	511
Antigua and Barbuda	3,361	359	368	337	344	369	290	324	322	325	323
Mauritania	3,316	495	393	410	354	320	298	317	287	212	230
United States	3,241	201	269	279	319	358	370	468	409	306	262
Norway	3,130	334	339	276	335	271	310	362	290	284	329
Tonga	3,048	343	408	276	348	320	327	283	262	225	256
Montenegro	2,779	120	204	265	265	289	251	387	323	299	376
Saint Kitts and Nevis	2,720	339	350	311	259	263	222	250	238	250	238
Turkmenistan	2,499	224	260	223	210	254	226	235	251	286	330
Samoa	2,194	219	267	238	237	239	207	219	194	179	195
Qatar	2,123	148	193	141	191	202	229	272	224	236	287
Estonia	2,029	260	191	227	211	220	189	211	176	151	193
Malawi	1,873	164	123	192	159	172	160	205	228	257	213
Central African Republic	1,868	101	134	116	213	155	234	202	178	304	231
Djibouti	1,784	37	56	106	90	190	370	281	222	281	151
Czechoslovakia	1,746	750	466	159	74	74	58	62	52	51	-
Angola	1,737	148	148	187	143	148	154	198	209	176	226
Suriname	1,715	216	196	187	178	158	134	156	136	182	172
Chad	1,667	120	171	155	111	119	175	136	205	251	224
Gabon	1,554	138	204	197	127	167	146	165	150	112	148
Bahrain	1,303	104	119	104	115	122	145	138	130	143	183
Cyprus	1,177	122	101	107	126	129	113	131	117	120	111
Macau	1,111	143	130	120	106	105	99	109	109	91	99
Iceland	969	105	90	103	139	86	104	97	86	89	70
South Sudan	937	X	-	17	59	74	127	124	160	185	191
Niger	932	96	96	48	37	71	55	119	116	93	201
Oman	923	63	60	74	73	90	85	116	104	110	148
Slovenia	917	74	69	86	62	78	107	119	108	95	119
Mauritius	890	84	101	77	83	81	96	110	96	67	95
Bermuda	850	72	71	85	88	106	112	99	68	65	84
Mozambique	832	53	60	94	73	71	107	101	96	100	77
Madagascar	797	80	83	79	95	86	72	88	60	79	75
Namibia	739	60	43	59	57	44	86	87	130	75	98
Botswana	717	66	76	80	53	58	61	78	112	72	61
Malta	572	74	51	62	43	39	58	65	75	58	47
Netherlands Antilles	519	77	86	106	128	45	22	18	9	7	21
Korea, North	514	35	36	49	48	142	55	47	32	41	29
Cayman Islands	504	52	41	44	44	48	53	55	67	47	53
Aruba	432	49	39	54	45	40	38	23	47	45	52
Virgin Islands, British	421	46	37	39	45	56	38	40	25	37	58
All other countries	418	44	34	34	39	48	48	48	43	40	40
Turks and Caicos Islands	391	29	33	30	50	40	38	39	35	41	56
Guinea-Bissau	381	30	29	47	43	30	39	37	48	27	51
Marshall Islands	359	37	38	50	46	56	32	32	23	23	22
Luxembourg	297	22	24	19	40	26	27	34	33	30	42
Brunei	238	20	25	19	21	25	21	31	24	29	23
Sint Maarten	231	X	-	-	-	45	45	42	35	27	37
Curacao	227	X	-	-	-	27	22	35	34	56	53
Papua New Guinea	219	30	20	21	27	18	11	23	18	27	24
Anguilla	211	19	25	23	22	20	22	20	23	23	14
Eswatini	211	22	19	24	15	23	19	20	19	18	32
Montserrat	206	27	30	27	-	38	14	14	12	20	24
Lesotho	198	23	25	17	20	13	23	19	24	12	22
Equatorial Guinea	188	12	13	20	18	15	25	18	20	17	30
French Polynesia	187	16	21	30	-	24	14	27	20	10	25
Palau	126	18	7	10	16	12	15	14	13	7	14
Federated States of Micronesia	104	10	9	13	4	5	6	11	6	19	21
Monaco	94	12	6	5	8	8	10	11	14	13	7
Seychelles	92	8	15	7	6	7	11	16	10	6	6
Sao Tome and Principe	91	10	9	12	6	5	6	12	10	9	12
Maldives	58	5	D	3	5	13	8	11	5	D	8
Comoros	50	4	8	10	D	9	5	4	D	8	10
American Samoa	14	14	D	-	D	-	-	-	D	D	-
Total	10,633,446	1,042,625	1,062,040	1,031,631	990,553	1,016,518	1,051,031	1,183,505	1,127,167	1,096,611	1,031,765

===== 2000s =====
Immigrant arrivals by country of birth (2000–2009)
1. Mexico (16.8%)
2. China (6.19%)
3. India (6.17%)
4. Philippines (5.55%)
5. Cuba (2.95%)
6. Vietnam (2.93%)
7. Dominican Republic (2.84%)
8. El Salvador (2.49%)
9. Colombia (2.36%)
10. Other (51.7%)

Persons obtaining lawful permanent resident status by region and selected country of last residence
Country	2000–2009	2000	2001	2002	2003	2004	2005	2006	2007	2008	2009
Mexico	1,727,614	173,493	205,560	218,822	115,585	175,411	161,445	173,749	148,640	189,989	164,920
China	637,400	45,585	56,267	61,082	40,568	55,494	69,933	87,307	76,655	80,271	64,238
India	635,195	41,903	70,032	70,823	50,228	70,151	84,680	61,369	65,353	63,352	57,304
Philippines	571,405	42,343	52,919	51,040	45,250	57,846	60,746	74,606	72,596	54,030	60,029
Cuba	303,778	18,960	27,453	28,182	9,262	20,488	36,261	45,614	29,104	49,500	38,954
Vietnam	302,043	26,553	35,419	33,563	22,087	31,524	32,784	30,691	28,691	31,497	29,234
Dominican Republic	292,728	17,465	21,195	22,515	26,159	30,506	27,503	38,068	28,024	31,879	49,414
El Salvador	256,566	22,543	31,089	31,060	28,231	29,807	21,359	31,782	21,127	19,659	19,909
Colombia	243,337	14,427	16,627	18,758	14,720	18,846	25,566	43,144	33,187	30,213	27,849
Korea, South	214,003	15,721	20,532	20,724	12,382	19,766	26,562	24,386	22,405	26,666	25,859
Haiti	213,508	22,337	27,031	20,213	12,293	14,191	14,524	22,226	30,405	26,007	24,280
Jamaica	176,839	15,949	15,322	14,835	13,347	14,430	18,345	24,976	19,375	18,477	21,783
Canada	170,909	16,057	21,752	19,352	11,350	15,569	21,878	18,207	15,495	15,109	16,140
Guatemala	159,150	9,942	13,496	16,178	14,386	18,920	16,818	24,133	17,908	16,182	12,187
Ukraine	156,326	15,511	20,914	21,190	11,633	14,156	22,745	17,140	11,001	10,813	11,223
United Kingdom	153,938	13,273	18,278	16,297	9,527	14,915	19,800	17,207	14,545	14,348	15,748
Pakistan	153,202	14,504	16,393	13,694	9,415	12,086	14,926	17,418	13,492	19,719	21,555
Russia	149,942	16,940	20,313	20,771	13,935	17,410	18,055	13,159	9,426	11,695	8,238
Peru	141,996	9,579	11,062	11,918	9,409	11,794	15,676	21,718	17,699	15,184	16,957
Iran	120,235	8,487	10,425	12,960	7,230	10,434	13,887	13,947	10,460	13,852	18,553
Poland	119,271	10,090	11,769	12,711	10,510	14,326	15,351	17,051	10,355	8,354	8,754
Brazil	118,473	6,943	9,448	9,439	6,331	10,556	16,662	17,903	14,295	12,195	14,701
Ecuador	108,705	7,651	9,665	10,561	7,066	8,626	11,608	17,489	12,248	11,663	12,128
Nigeria	105,667	7,831	8,253	8,105	7,872	9,374	10,597	13,459	12,448	12,475	15,253
Bosnia and Herzegovina	99,579	11,525	23,594	25,329	6,155	10,552	14,074	3,789	1,569	1,491	1,501
Ethiopia	99,519	4,053	5,092	7,565	6,635	8,286	10,571	16,152	12,786	12,917	15,462
Bangladesh	99,125	7,204	7,152	5,483	4,616	8,061	11,487	14,644	12,074	11,753	16,651
Taiwan	89,219	9,019	12,120	9,775	6,917	9,005	9,196	8,086	8,990	9,073	8,038
Venezuela	79,675	4,693	5,170	5,228	4,018	6,220	10,645	11,341	10,692	10,514	11,154
Germany	78,362	7,565	9,790	8,888	5,064	7,099	9,264	8,436	7,582	7,091	7,583
Nicaragua	78,260	20,947	19,634	10,659	4,094	4,009	3,305	4,145	3,716	3,614	4,137
Japan	76,835	7,049	9,578	8,248	5,971	7,697	8,768	8,265	6,748	6,821	7,690
Guyana	75,184	5,719	8,279	9,938	6,809	6,351	9,317	9,552	5,726	6,823	6,670
Egypt	68,559	4,450	5,159	4,852	3,348	5,522	7,905	10,500	9,267	8,712	8,844
Honduras	64,855	5,917	6,571	6,435	4,645	5,508	7,012	8,177	7,646	6,540	6,404
Trinidad and Tobago	63,957	6,635	6,618	5,738	4,138	5,384	6,568	8,854	6,829	5,937	6,256
Thailand	62,672	3,753	4,245	4,144	3,126	4,318	5,505	11,749	8,751	6,637	10,444
Ghana	62,421	4,339	4,023	4,248	4,410	5,337	6,491	9,367	7,610	8,195	8,401
Somalia	61,986	2,393	3,007	4,535	2,444	3,929	5,829	9,462	6,251	10,745	13,390
Romania	56,486	6,863	6,628	4,887	3,655	4,571	7,103	7,137	5,802	4,930	4,910
Kenya	55,475	2,197	2,501	3,199	3,209	5,335	5,347	8,779	7,030	6,998	9,880
Albania	50,569	4,755	4,358	3,765	3,362	3,840	5,947	7,914	5,737	5,754	5,137
Iraq	50,254	5,087	4,965	5,174	2,450	3,494	4,077	4,337	3,765	4,795	12,110
Israel	48,911	2,783	3,744	3,826	2,741	4,160	5,755	5,943	4,496	5,851	5,612
Argentina	48,395	2,317	3,297	3,661	3,129	4,805	7,081	7,327	5,645	5,353	5,780
Serbia and Montenegro	46,757	2,742	6,203	10,387	2,994	3,331	5,202	5,891	3,586	3,255	3,166
Hong Kong	43,819	5,407	8,300	6,075	3,574	3,951	3,705	3,256	3,527	3,373	2,651
Morocco	42,969	3,614	4,958	3,387	3,137	4,128	4,411	4,949	4,513	4,425	5,447
Liberia	41,938	1,570	2,273	2,869	1,766	2,757	4,880	6,887	4,102	7,193	7,641
Bulgaria	41,540	4,917	4,400	3,608	3,825	4,253	5,635	4,828	3,981	2,960	3,133
Lebanon	39,967	3,662	4,579	3,935	2,956	3,818	4,282	4,083	4,267	4,254	3,831
France	39,221	3,442	4,569	3,797	2,375	3,595	4,399	4,258	3,423	4,872	4,491
Turkey	39,208	2,606	3,215	3,375	3,029	3,835	4,614	4,941	4,425	4,210	4,958
Jordan	38,715	3,900	4,572	3,964	2,927	3,431	3,748	4,038	3,917	3,936	4,282
Soviet Union	35,773	3,263	2,707	2,403	1,072	929	2,899	6,229	5,090	5,270	5,911
Cambodia	34,741	2,138	2,462	2,800	2,263	3,553	4,022	5,773	4,246	3,713	3,771
Burma	33,313	1,201	1,373	1,356	1,193	1,379	2,095	4,562	3,130	3,403	13,621
South Africa	32,974	2,824	4,090	3,861	2,210	3,370	4,536	3,201	2,988	2,723	3,171
Uzbekistan	32,828	1,631	2,031	2,317	1,445	1,995	2,887	4,015	4,665	6,375	5,467
Sudan	31,036	1,531	1,650	2,921	1,883	3,211	5,231	5,504	2,930	3,598	3,577
Indonesia	30,727	1,767	2,525	2,418	1,805	2,419	3,924	4,868	3,716	3,606	3,679
Armenia	28,222	1,253	1,762	1,800	1,287	1,833	2,591	6,317	4,351	3,586	3,442
Nepal	26,641	616	945	1,137	2,095	2,878	3,158	3,733	3,472	4,093	4,514
Italy	26,368	2,448	3,096	2,578	1,644	2,346	3,066	3,215	2,569	2,514	2,892
Australia	25,898	2,044	2,811	2,557	1,836	2,604	3,193	3,249	2,518	2,464	2,622
Belarus	25,821	2,170	2,901	2,923	1,858	2,255	3,503	3,086	2,328	2,390	2,407
Syria	25,685	2,367	3,350	2,557	1,938	2,256	2,831	2,918	2,385	2,641	2,442
Bolivia	24,473	1,761	1,819	1,664	1,376	1,768	2,197	4,025	2,590	2,436	2,837
Afghanistan	23,258	1,011	1,202	1,759	1,252	2,137	4,749	3,417	1,753	2,813	3,165
Yemen	22,841	1,789	1,607	1,227	1,382	1,760	3,366	4,308	2,396	1,872	3,134
Unknown	22,724	1,172	2,311	2,622	1,201	3,227	5,303	2,734	1,394	1,394	1,366
Sierra Leone	22,581	1,585	1,878	2,246	1,492	1,596	2,731	3,572	1,999	2,795	2,687
Chile	22,299	1,700	1,921	1,839	1,310	1,810	2,404	2,774	2,274	2,017	2,250
Malaysia	20,323	1,551	2,439	2,124	1,200	1,987	2,632	2,281	2,149	1,945	2,014
Costa Rica	20,036	1,310	1,733	1,591	1,246	1,755	2,278	3,109	2,540	2,090	2,384
Moldova	19,965	1,251	2,068	2,103	1,151	1,507	3,506	3,036	1,356	1,692	2,295
Cameroon	19,874	860	791	984	927	1,309	1,458	2,919	3,392	3,771	3,463
Kazakhstan	18,856	1,493	2,310	2,315	1,740	1,906	2,223	2,073	1,604	1,630	1,562
Lithuania	18,312	1,349	1,732	1,786	2,266	2,480	2,417	1,885	1,361	967	1,069
Panama	17,590	1,829	1,867	1,680	1,164	1,417	1,815	2,418	1,916	1,678	1,806
Sri Lanka	16,689	1,118	1,505	1,529	1,246	1,431	1,894	2,191	1,831	1,935	2,009
Laos	16,639	1,358	1,398	1,245	896	1,147	1,242	2,892	2,575	2,198	1,688
Spain	15,409	1,254	1,711	1,361	917	1,339	1,888	1,971	1,578	1,621	1,769
Fiji	15,375	1,483	1,452	1,208	1,095	1,593	1,422	2,115	1,637	1,176	1,194
Ireland	15,313	1,296	1,505	1,398	983	1,531	2,088	1,906	1,503	1,465	1,637
Croatia	14,531	1,058	2,853	3,798	1,153	1,511	1,780	945	482	455	496
Netherlands	14,422	1,337	1,679	1,549	981	1,303	1,815	1,651	1,368	1,240	1,499
Cape Verde	13,785	1,079	868	871	745	1,015	1,225	1,780	2,048	1,916	2,238
Sweden	13,750	1,264	1,682	1,376	963	1,270	1,517	1,376	1,145	1,019	1,138
Togo	13,185	386	487	935	1,187	2,041	1,523	1,720	1,565	1,661	1,680
Azerbaijan	13,032	1,036	1,152	1,164	746	969	1,523	2,371	1,166	1,071	834
Hungary	12,831	1,023	1,263	1,274	1,021	1,272	1,567	1,704	1,266	1,127	1,314
Georgia	12,008	493	786	886	735	964	1,389	2,003	1,554	1,620	1,578
Saudi Arabia	11,431	1,063	1,178	1,014	735	906	1,210	1,542	1,171	1,194	1,418
Portugal	11,413	1,343	1,609	1,313	808	1,069	1,125	1,409	1,019	772	946
Côte d'Ivoire	10,807	439	596	629	483	666	930	2,067	1,193	1,645	2,159
Kuwait	10,754	1,015	1,258	1,056	707	1,091	1,152	1,230	1,017	1,104	1,124
New Zealand	10,574	964	1,205	1,117	877	1,131	1,293	1,100	1,047	893	947
Belize	10,437	757	936	966	588	871	876	1,252	1,073	1,077	1,041
Algeria	10,348	906	875	1,030	759	805	1,115	1,300	1,036	1,037	1,485
Uruguay	10,221	426	541	536	469	787	1,154	1,664	1,418	1,451	1,775
Republic of Macedonia	9,809	790	921	821	653	775	1,070	1,317	1,227	1,107	1,128
Eritrea	9,381	382	540	560	556	675	796	1,593	1,081	1,270	1,928
Singapore	9,289	668	1,100	1,033	582	966	1,204	997	985	922	832
Greece	9,177	950	1,155	1,009	651	769	1,070	1,124	882	769	798
Switzerland	9,116	1,029	1,298	1,004	632	855	1,092	983	705	720	798
Tanzania	9,055	480	476	577	554	747	829	949	832	838	2,773
Senegal	9,015	554	663	530	522	769	913	1,367	1,024	1,149	1,524
Saint Lucia	8,905	599	674	583	488	616	832	1,212	928	946	1,027
Czechoslovakia	8,521	665	863	897	543	673	784	1,442	927	862	865
Uganda	8,516	418	457	575	455	721	858	1,372	1,122	1,174	1,364
Congo, Republic of the	8,509	189	311	677	513	670	1,064	1,600	972	950	1,563
Slovakia	7,755	549	809	725	674	800	965	1,111	763	653	706
Barbados	7,313	777	895	813	516	630	846	959	689	585	603
Zimbabwe	7,232	322	475	484	358	628	923	1,049	1,057	953	983
Bahamas	7,223	766	924	808	423	586	698	847	738	682	751
Grenada	7,215	655	645	634	481	609	840	1,068	751	784	748
Belgium	6,887	670	814	769	455	638	859	716	638	642	686
Guinea	6,559	3	11	16	29	347	495	1,110	1,088	1,735	1,725
United Arab Emirates	6,299	435	460	472	380	586	812	1,006	758	693	697
Congo, Democratic Republic of the	6,221	123	145	178	110	155	260	738	1,129	1,261	2,122
Latvia	6,132	548	711	683	458	605	768	892	568	455	444
Denmark	5,858	537	706	609	405	566	718	699	517	498	603
Gambia	5,670	231	390	343	263	422	581	897	826	739	978
Kyrgyzstan	5,482	388	582	473	356	439	656	785	597	632	574
Saint Vincent and the Grenadines	5,365	497	559	480	322	400	625	756	567	568	591
Austria	4,603	405	522	483	295	402	532	524	485	443	512
Zambia	4,517	211	295	308	280	359	499	672	576	613	704
Paraguay	4,421	338	401	356	207	328	516	719	545	481	530
Tunisia	4,343	307	438	540	353	457	495	510	417	410	416
Antigua and Barbuda	4,291	429	461	380	301	414	440	570	415	444	437
Finland	4,196	377	497	426	241	388	574	542	426	302	423
Norway	4,166	459	547	431	320	405	423	481	343	350	407
Niger	4,122	30	1,330	1,263	808	62	126	116	97	107	183
Mauritania	3,717	88	117	124	131	170	275	720	651	844	597
Saint Kitts and Nevis	3,534	500	463	342	310	299	342	458	347	363	310
Mongolia	3,505	46	102	135	153	229	323	497	530	659	831
Tonga	3,500	349	327	331	238	327	309	437	438	365	379
Estonia	3,285	239	348	343	235	322	438	423	368	287	282
Rwanda	3,175	73	148	217	109	163	276	502	357	378	952
Czech Republic	3,022	244	307	267	267	457	476	344	287	227	146
Burundi	2,924	28	79	120	74	100	186	320	257	255	1,505
Mali	2,816	109	119	105	124	163	277	408	412	523	576
Dominica	2,707	95	93	148	204	132	198	471	428	454	484
Suriname	2,350	256	245	247	180	166	300	314	197	218	227
Samoa	2,310	184	165	157	178	203	173	283	290	227	250
Macau	2,193	270	340	284	244	192	133	189	178	205	158
Libya	2,147	180	223	158	140	185	223	271	186	285	296
Benin	1,979	62	75	137	76	185	193	275	258	317	401
Tajikistan	1,942	156	187	181	137	167	207	239	172	231	265
Turkmenistan	1,662	97	94	93	84	117	148	248	217	274	290
Cyprus	1,596	160	216	158	123	143	196	180	137	141	142
Burkina Faso	1,584	48	68	64	60	103	128	221	238	238	416
Angola	1,492	87	94	92	59	107	188	272	199	221	173
Qatar	1,350	97	125	108	72	125	174	226	138	151	134
United States	1,335	35	63	64	32	57	183	333	171	216	181
Iceland	1,186	129	134	93	97	105	135	145	95	122	131
Bahrain	1,121	106	118	85	59	116	140	148	133	96	120
Guinea-Bissau	1,060	204	273	289	176	5	26	25	25	17	20
Bermuda	1,053	71	98	108	92	100	116	160	108	92	108
Malawi	1,014	61	70	56	62	83	131	131	123	133	164
Slovenia	1,013	76	142	140	64	88	114	115	87	79	108
Netherlands Antilles	879	53	114	97	59	72	116	100	93	78	97
Oman	868	51	55	61	76	122	101	155	103	70	74
Bhutan	847	D	5	14	15	17	30	78	52	42	594
Mauritius	831	54	84	83	57	65	99	108	88	83	110
Gabon	680	18	32	41	40	50	66	85	95	82	171
Mozambique	586	41	48	54	36	59	54	78	81	69	66
Malta	570	54	57	44	37	57	74	70	53	66	58
Madagascar	564	33	61	43	40	54	60	72	53	77	71
Montserrat	552	70	61	42	36	33	50	90	66	61	43
Chad	521	23	44	47	8	23	31	73	74	96	102
British Virgin Islands	485	67	70	43	43	35	41	47	40	53	46
Namibia	485	30	54	46	40	40	63	56	57	46	53
Guadeloupe	471	51	84	38	35	59	48	53	38	33	32
Botswana	380	13	24	30	27	34	54	53	49	41	55
All other countries	379	35	42	52	32	33	52	40	28	25	40
Cayman Islands	375	31	23	24	35	38	37	65	40	37	45
Central African Republic	373	4	11	13	6	17	24	51	52	88	107
Aruba	366	25	29	32	27	31	42	51	55	36	38
Turks and Caicos Islands	347	46	33	31	26	28	34	52	31	35	31
Marshall Islands	323	3	D	26	26	48	32	53	48	39	48
Djibouti	319	14	22	30	16	37	50	34	23	39	54
Anguilla	283	25	55	20	26	22	35	32	25	22	21
Luxembourg	281	26	34	32	16	13	35	28	39	28	30
Papua New Guinea	265	21	26	26	34	19	44	30	31	15	19
Brunei	263	16	27	28	20	22	49	25	32	18	26
Martinique	239	20	22	19	14	26	37	30	23	24	24
French Polynesia	207	13	16	12	14	13	19	37	27	26	30
Eswatini	180	12	18	12	23	15	16	11	13	18	42
American Samoa	176	7	28	26	16	12	15	28	11	14	19
Seychelles	161	18	18	20	16	25	16	15	7	16	10
Lesotho	121	9	6	13	5	14	12	18	14	16	14
Equatorial Guinea	104	5	3	8	D	13	10	13	4	16	32
French Guiana	90	13	8	6	4	3	8	15	9	6	18
Palau	79	3	3	10	8	6	8	8	11	6	16
Federated States of Micronesia	77	5	9	D	4	5	6	12	7	13	16
Monaco	72	12	9	17	3	7	7	D	6	7	4
Korea, North	67	NA	NA	NA	NA	NA	NA	NA	NA	NA	67
Maldives	61	D	9	9	15	7	6	D	9	D	6
Sao Tome and Principe	60	8	D	4	D	9	8	6	7	7	11
Solomon Islands	57	7	7	7	5	6	3	5	10	7	D
United States Virgin Islands	53	3	6	9	4	13	8	7	3	D	D
New Caledonia	49	3	6	5	D	D	5	7	5	5	13
Kiribati	43	3	-	D	4	D	4	8	10	4	10
Total	10,299,430	841,002	1,058,902	1,059,356	703,542	957,883	1,122,257	1,266,129	1,052,415	1,107,126	1,130,818

==== 20th-century ====
===== 1990s =====
Immigrant arrivals by country of birth (1990–1999)
1. Mexico (27.6%)
2. Philippines (5.49%)
3. Vietnam (5.03%)
4. China (4.38%)
5. India (3.96%)
6. Dominican Republic (3.95%)
7. El Salvador (2.70%)
8. South Korea (incl. North Korea) (2.08%)
9. Jamaica (1.88%)
10. Other (42.9%)

Persons obtaining lawful permanent resident status by region or selected country of last residence
	1990–1999	1990	1991	1992	1993	1994	1995	1996	1997	1998	1999
Mexico	2,693,981	679,068	946,167	213,802	126,561	111,398	89,932	163,572	146,865	131,575	147,573
Philippines	535,335	63,756	63,596	61,022	63,457	53,535	50,984	55,876	49,117	34,466	31,026
Vietnam	490,470	48,792	55,307	77,735	59,614	41,345	41,752	42,067	38,519	17,649	20,393
China	427,614	31,815	33,025	38,907	65,578	53,985	35,463	41,728	41,147	36,884	32,204
Africa	386,419	35,893	36,179	27,086	27,783	26,712	42,456	52,889	47,791	40,660	36,700
India	385,835	30,667	45,064	36,755	40,121	34,921	34,748	44,859	38,071	36,482	30,237
Dominican Republic	385,057	42,195	41,405	41,969	45,420	51,189	38,512	39,604	27,053	20,387	17,864
El Salvador	263,551	80,173	47,351	26,191	26,818	17,644	11,744	17,903	17,969	14,590	14,606
South Korea(incl. North Korea)	203,248	32,301	26,518	19,359	18,026	16,011	16,047	18,185	14,239	14,268	12,840
Jamaica	183,137	25,013	23,828	18,915	17,241	14,349	16,398	19,089	17,840	15,146	14,733
Poland	180,035	20,537	19,199	25,504	27,846	28,048	13,824	15,772	12,038	8,469	8,798
Haiti	163,891	20,324	47,527	11,002	10,094	13,333	14,021	18,386	15,057	13,449	16,532
Cuba	155,004	10,645	10,349	11,791	13,666	14,727	17,937	26,466	33,587	17,375	14,132
Canada	148,165	16,812	13,504	15,205	17,156	16,068	12,932	15,825	11,609	10,190	8,864
Iran	142,883	24,977	19,569	13,233	14,841	11,422	9,201	11,084	9,642	7,883	7,203
Colombia	138,846	24,189	19,702	13,201	12,819	10,847	10,838	14,283	13,004	11,836	9,966
United Kingdom	138,460	15,928	13,903	19,973	18,783	16,326	12,427	13,624	10,708	9,018	7,690
Soviet Union	126,115	25,524	56,980	4,653	7,369	6,954	6,784	3,513	2,944	6,336	5,058
Ukraine	125,993	X	X	14,383	18,316	21,010	17,432	21,079	15,696	7,448	10,123
Pakistan	124,013	9,729	20,355	10,214	8,927	8,698	9,774	12,519	12,967	13,094	13,496
Guatemala	119,748	32,303	25,527	10,521	11,870	7,389	6,213	8,763	7,785	7,759	7,308
Peru	111,845	15,726	16,237	9,868	10,447	9,177	8,066	12,871	10,853	10,154	8,438
Russia	110,921	X	X	8,857	12,079	15,249	14,560	19,668	16,632	11,529	12,347
Taiwan	108,791	15,151	13,274	16,344	14,329	10,032	9,377	13,401	6,745	7,097	6,714
Nicaragua	85,466	11,562	17,842	8,949	7,086	5,255	4,408	6,903	6,331	3,521	13,389
Ecuador	81,204	12,476	9,958	7,286	7,324	5,906	6,397	8,321	7,780	6,852	8,904
Guyana	79,570	11,362	11,666	9,064	8,384	7,662	7,362	9,489	7,257	3,963	3,300
Hong Kong	76,019	9,393	10,427	10,452	9,161	7,731	7,249	7,834	5,577	5,275	4,917
Honduras	73,714	12,024	11,451	6,552	7,306	5,265	5,496	5,870	7,616	6,463	4,809
Nigeria	69,145	8,843	7,912	4,551	4,448	3,950	6,818	10,221	7,038	7,746	6,769
Ireland	67,975	10,333	4,767	12,226	13,590	17,256	5,315	1,731	1,001	944	812
Trinidad and Tobago	65,394	6,740	8,407	7,008	6,577	6,292	5,424	7,344	6,409	4,852	4,283
Bangladesh	62,773	4,252	10,676	3,740	3,291	3,434	6,072	8,221	8,681	8,621	6,046
Japan	62,182	5,734	5,049	11,028	6,908	6,093	4,837	6,011	5,097	5,138	4,217
Germany	60,082	X	6,509	9,888	7,312	6,992	6,237	6,748	5,723	5,472	5,201
Romania	55,303	4,647	8,096	6,500	5,601	3,444	4,871	5,801	5,545	5,112	5,686
Thailand	53,672	8,914	7,397	7,090	6,654	5,489	5,136	4,310	3,094	3,102	2,381
Laos	52,651	10,446	9,950	8,696	7,285	5,089	3,936	2,847	1,935	1,612	854
Brazil	49,509	4,191	8,133	4,755	4,604	4,491	4,558	5,891	4,583	4,401	3,902
Ethiopia	47,385	4,336	5,127	4,602	5,191	3,887	5,960	6,086	5,904	4,205	4,272
Lebanon	46,450	5,634	6,009	5,838	5,465	4,319	3,884	4,382	3,568	3,290	3,040
Egypt	45,823	4,117	5,602	3,576	3,556	3,392	5,648	6,186	5,031	4,831	4,429
Jordan	41,566	4,449	4,259	4,036	4,741	3,990	3,649	4,445	4,171	3,255	3,274
Iraq	38,815	1,756	1,494	4,111	4,072	6,025	5,596	5,481	3,244	2,220	3,372
Israel	35,769	4,664	4,181	5,104	4,494	3,425	2,523	3,126	2,448	1,991	1,858
Ghana	35,630	4,466	3,330	1,867	1,604	1,458	3,152	6,606	5,105	4,458	3,714
Argentina	28,498	5,437	3,889	3,877	2,824	2,318	1,762	2,456	1,964	1,511	1,393
Venezuela	28,343	3,142	2,622	2,340	2,743	2,427	2,627	3,468	3,328	3,136	2,508
Bosnia and Herzegovina	27,301	X	X	15	159	521	4,061	6,499	6,392	4,212	5,442
France	26,879	2,849	2,450	3,288	2,864	2,715	2,505	3,079	2,568	2,352	2,209
Belarus	26,783	X	X	3,233	4,702	5,420	3,791	4,268	3,062	981	1,326
Cambodia	26,580	5,179	3,251	2,573	1,639	1,404	1,492	1,568	1,638	1,439	1,400
Panama	26,384	3,433	4,204	2,845	2,679	2,378	2,247	2,560	1,981	1,646	1,646
Syria	26,306	2,972	2,837	2,940	2,933	2,426	2,362	3,072	2,269	2,840	2,056
Turkey	26,181	2,468	2,528	2,488	2,204	1,840	2,947	3,657	3,145	2,682	2,219
Portugal	25,428	4,035	4,524	2,748	2,081	2,169	2,615	2,984	1,665	1,536	1,071
Armenia	25,346	X	X	6,145	6,287	3,984	1,992	2,441	2,094	1,146	1,257
Yugoslavia	25,127	2,828	2,713	2,504	2,230	2,038	2,907	3,605	2,793	2,408	1,897
Italy	23,365	3,287	2,619	2,592	2,487	2,305	2,231	2,501	1,982	1,831	1,530
Uzbekistan	22,987	X	X	1,712	2,664	3,435	3,645	4,687	3,312	601	1,223
Chile	21,971	4,049	2,842	1,937	1,778	1,640	1,534	1,706	1,443	1,240	1,092
Albania	21,513	78	142	682	1,400	1,489	1,420	4,007	4,375	4,221	3,699
South Africa	21,343	1,990	1,854	2,516	2,197	2,144	2,560	2,966	2,093	1,904	1,580
Somalia	19,890	277	458	500	1,088	1,737	3,487	2,170	4,005	2,629	1,710
Bolivia	19,399	2,843	3,006	1,510	1,545	1,404	1,332	1,913	1,734	1,513	1,448
Afghanistan	19,191	3,187	2,879	2,685	2,964	2,344	1,424	1,263	1,129	831	878
Indonesia	18,708	3,498	2,223	2,916	1,767	1,367	1,020	1,084	906	1,020	1,187
Bulgaria	18,654	428	623	1,049	1,029	981	1,797	2,066	2,774	3,735	4,172
Mozambique	17,401	100	74	54	56	44	50	59	48	39	31
Liberia	16,929	2,004	1,292	999	1,050	1,762	1,929	2,206	2,216	1,617	1,358
Morocco	16,924	1,200	1,601	1,316	1,176	1,074	1,726	1,783	2,359	2,410	2,971
Australia	16,584	1,754	1,678	2,238	2,320	2,049	1,751	1,950	1,630	1,147	1,112
Yemen	15,645	X	1,547	2,056	1,793	741	1,501	2,209	1,663	1,859	1,161
Greece	15,403	2,742	2,079	1,858	1,884	1,440	1,309	1,452	1,049	863	727
Costa Rica	15,286	2,840	2,341	1,480	1,368	1,205	1,062	1,504	1,330	1,204	886
Malaysia	15,191	1,867	1,860	2,235	2,026	1,480	1,223	1,414	1,051	1,011	994
Spain	14,310	1,886	1,849	1,631	1,388	1,418	1,321	1,659	1,241	1,043	874
Azerbaijan	14,003	X	X	1,640	2,943	2,844	1,885	1,991	1,450	504	746
Fiji	13,638	1,353	1,349	807	854	1,007	1,491	1,847	1,549	1,717	1,601
Kenya	13,293	1,297	1,185	953	1,065	1,017	1,419	1,666	1,387	1,696	1,412
Moldova	12,979	X	X	1,705	2,646	2,260	1,856	1,849	1,347	562	754
Netherlands	12,334	1,424	1,283	1,586	1,430	1,239	1,196	1,423	1,059	917	777
Belize	11,852	3,867	2,377	1,020	1,035	772	644	786	664	496	572
Sierra Leone	11,812	1,290	951	693	690	698	919	1,918	1,884	955	976
Sweden	11,811	1,196	1,080	1,463	1,393	1,140	976	1,251	958	823	822
Sudan	11,633	306	679	675	714	651	1,645	2,172	2,030	1,161	1,354
Myanmar	11,492	1,120	946	816	849	938	1,233	1,320	1,085	1,371	1,204
Hungary	11,003	1,655	1,534	1,304	1,091	880	900	1,183	949	809	698
Sri Lanka	10,887	976	1,377	1,081	1,109	989	960	1,277	1,128	1,085	903
Barbados	10,404	1,745	1,460	1,091	1,184	897	734	1,043	829	726	720
Kuwait	9,057	691	861	989	1,129	1,065	961	1,202	837	749	803
Cape Verde	9,045	907	973	757	936	810	968	1,012	920	814	909
Switzerland	8,479	845	696	1,023	972	877	881	1,006	1,063	828	649
Bahamas	8,155	1,378	1,062	641	686	589	585	768	641	602	401
Grenada	8,049	1,294	979	848	827	595	583	787	755	655	667
New Zealand	7,922	829	793	967	1,052	918	727	800	655	628	527
Czechoslovakia	7,597	1,412	1,156	1,181	990	642	599	561	395	342	319
West Germany	7,338	7,338	X	X	X	X	X	X	X	X	X
Saudi Arabia	7,258	518	552	584	616	668	788	1,164	815	703	763
Dominica	6,959	963	982	809	683	507	591	797	746	283	41
Lithuania	6,768	67	157	353	529	663	767	1,080	812	1,191	1,149
Algeria	6,560	302	269	407	360	364	650	1,059	717	804	789
Saint Vincent and the Grenadines	6,537	973	808	687	657	524	349	606	581	414	444
Saint Lucia	6,462	833	766	654	634	449	403	582	531	509	529
Uruguay	6,452	1,457	1,161	716	568	516	414	540	429	368	271
Tonga	6,346	1,375	1,685	703	348	293	403	416	303	230	283
Antigua and Barbuda	6,343	1,319	944	619	554	438	374	406	393	297	456
Kazakhstan	6,101	X	X	506	628	750	840	1,089	1,025	540	723
Denmark	5,785	666	601	764	735	606	551	608	429	457	368
Belgium	5,783	682	525	780	657	516	569	651	554	421	428
Singapore	5,600	620	535	774	798	542	399	561	460	389	358
Cameroon	5,313	380	452	236	262	305	506	803	898	691	826
Paraguay	5,183	704	538	514	668	789	559	615	304	275	217
Saint Kitts and Nevis	5,178	896	830	626	544	370	360	357	377	405	463
Austria	5,094	675	589	701	549	499	518	554	487	291	231
Uganda	4,830	674	538	437	415	391	383	422	400	355	250
Latvia	4,796	45	86	419	668	762	651	736	615	370	444
Georgia	4,792	X	X	426	429	652	710	1,157	812	295	311
Norway	4,618	524	486	665	608	459	420	478	372	298	308
Tanzania	4,551	635	500	352	426	357	524	553	399	339	316
Senegal	4,380	537	869	337	178	213	506	641	435	373	370
Finland	4,319	369	333	525	544	471	476	602	376	314	309
Croatia	4,130	X	X	77	370	412	608	810	720	549	584
Eritrea	4,054	X	X	X	85	468	992	828	948	641	326
Republic of Macedonia	4,035	X	X	X	X	367	666	863	783	785	571
Cote d'Ivoire	3,208	184	347	259	250	268	289	432	430	364	305
Nepal	3,074	184	174	212	257	257	312	431	447	476	453
Macau	3,059	301	267	320	334	287	373	453	277	276	294
Slovakia	3,010	X	X	X	10	221	503	663	629	491	493
Tajikistan	2,972	X	X	186	336	568	706	634	311	66	104
Samoa	2,930	690	561	314	200	227	237	215	138	147	91
Democratic Republic of the Congo	2,810	256	238	196	233	237	355	433	414	155	88
Zimbabwe	2,689	272	261	296	308	246	299	385	274	186	184
Unknown or not reported	2,486	49	70	18	5	4	2	5	197	977	1,159
United Arab Emirates	2,430	192	164	172	196	286	317	343	329	329	310
Libya	2,226	268	314	286	343	166	216	250	171	166	156
Zambia	2,118	209	228	210	225	198	222	226	262	213	143
Cyprus	2,063	316	243	262	229	204	188	187	148	119	107
Suriname	1,956	240	178	238	211	190	213	211	191	143	141
Tunisia	1,933	226	275	216	167	149	189	228	163	200	150
Estonia	1,740	20	23	194	191	272	205	280	285	128	142
North Yemen	1,727	1,727	X	X	X	X	X	X	X	X	X
Gambia	1,627	170	159	93	76	93	153	207	176	227	183
Kyrgyzstan	1,560	X	X	134	124	226	209	280	287	111	189
Niger	1,514	3	1	2	4	8	10	102	837	283	12
Togo	1,333	30	33	45	41	52	83	157	222	246	254
Iceland	1,300	107	117	156	164	140	125	182	119	111	79
Bermuda	1,203	203	146	153	156	118	111	103	75	63	63
British Virgin Islands	1,183	105	137	174	166	137	98	87	93	55	76
Guinea	1,176	67	84	104	102	97	152	220	158	46	6
Montserrat	1,056	172	143	104	102	69	83	99	99	65	80
Angola	950	141	132	107	92	75	81	125	75	66	57
Mali	772	34	63	55	51	55	94	124	97	83	72
Bahrain	754	58	58	81	93	87	78	76	80	53	70
Czech Republic	723	X	X	X	-	11	72	165	186	144	145
Turks and Caicos Islands	722	206	121	59	39	26	27	35	37	46	27
Mauritius	653	67	64	61	83	65	67	84	44	37	38
Malta	652	77	83	85	52	75	72	52	54	59	43
Qatar	646	33	56	59	88	51	60	79	70	60	78
Turkmenistan	604	X	X	34	48	68	84	121	99	44	65
Rwanda	592	6	12	10	25	16	41	118	170	52	98
Malawi	582	48	68	72	53	55	56	58	72	39	41
United States	546	122	70	66	60	47	57	51	38	31	29
Netherlands Antilles	505	80	40	37	65	48	58	76	43	61	35
Slovenia	444	X	X	8	50	67	65	77	62	57	58
Guadeloupe	441	54	34	50	49	41	48	52	52	30	54
Republic of the Congo	420	9	22	9	10	11	11	23	31	118	190
Aruba	393	83	56	62	36	24	27	28	26	23	14
Guinea-Bissau	375	8	14	8	1	-	2	3	24	165	134
Madagascar	374	37	23	41	32	27	42	43	33	42	26
Anguilla	330	41	56	46	23	31	26	36	19	26	20
Benin	326	27	24	10	21	18	23	38	48	47	59
Cayman Islands	313	53	23	40	16	30	26	24	35	28	18
Palau	299	84	70	47	42	21	9	9	8	6	2
Burundi	254	5	16	11	13	14	26	36	59	51	16
Oman	248	9	5	24	21	32	31	25	36	25	40
Namibia	248	23	14	29	37	24	35	30	22	24	13
Mauritania	242	3	9	2	9	10	22	26	51	78	24
Luxembourg	222	31	21	25	14	24	15	32	28	21	11
South Yemen	218	218	X	X	X	X	X	X	X	X	X
French Polynesia	215	29	31	24	28	19	25	15	21	14	9
Martinique	208	32	25	25	17	20	11	23	20	20	23
Seychelles	192	21	32	30	23	22	18	16	15	5	10
Brunei	168	16	15	17	26	14	14	20	6	19	16
Papua New Guinea	167	14	20	17	15	22	13	17	15	10	14
Djibouti	164	22	21	14	14	10	25	19	18	15	6
Mongolia	150	-	2	6	8	21	17	17	22	26	41
Botswana	148	21	3	19	13	13	16	21	18	12	5
Burkina Faso	143	8	8	16	11	16	17	17	13	14	17
Gabon	136	11	11	9	5	11	13	29	24	21	4
Swaziland	106	11	5	8	10	7	20	16	11	8	8
East Germany	105	105	X	X	X	X	X	X	X	X	X
Chad	104	8	9	4	3	9	11	13	18	8	24
Central African Republic	100	14	8	8	15	7	2	27	10	6	3
Lesotho	84	16	4	15	5	8	10	11	6	4	5
Kiribati	64	5	13	15	4	4	5	6	5	4	-
Micronesia	62	7	6	11	11	7	7	5	2	4	2
New Caledonia	49	8	3	8	2	7	3	11	-	4	3
French Guiana	43	2	2	2	6	10	4	5	6	1	5
Northern Mariana Islands	42	5	6	3	3	-	4	4	3	3	7
Gibraltar	38	1	1	4	5	6	7	6	3	1	4
Monaco	38	2	5	4	-	3	5	4	4	6	5
Cook Islands	38	5	8	6	4	2	2	5	4	1	3
Sao Tome and Principe	35	1	4	7	-	1	6	4	2	3	6
Marshall Islands	33	3	2	4	2	1	5	3	3	6	3
Bhutan	30	1	2	1	2	2	2	8	6	6	4
Solomon Islands	30	7	2	1	3	5	2	2	1	5	2
Equatorial Guinea	25	5	5	2	1	1	1	1	2	7	1
Greenland	22	3	8	2	3	1	2	2	1	-	-
American Samoa	21	2	2	-	1	-	1	2	-	4	11
United States Virgin Islands	21	2	6	2	1	1	1	1	-	2	5
Andorra	20	5	1	2	2	2	-	5	3	-	-
Nauru	18	6	1	2	1	3	2	2	-	-	-
Wallis and Futuna	18	-	-	1	6	5	4	-	1	1	-
Puerto Rico	18	2	5	1	1	-	1	2	1	2	3
Liechtenstein	16	3	3	1	3	-	2	1	1	1	1
Vanuatu	15	2	5	1	-	-	1	-	1	2	2
Comoros	14	-	-	2	3	1	2	3	3	-	-
Saint Helena	12	1	2	1	4	-	3	1	-	-	-
Niue	12	-	1	-	1	2	1	-	3	1	3
Reunion	10	-	-	1	3	-	2	3	1	-	-
Tuvalu	10	4	-	-	3	-	2	-	-	1	-
San Marino	8	-	1	-	2	-	2	3	-	-	-
Maldives	7	-	1	-	2	-	1	1	1	1	-
Western Sahara	4	-	-	-	-	-	-	3	-	1	-
Christmas Island	3	-	-	-	2	-	-	-	1	-	-
Saint Pierre and Miquelon	3	-	-	1	-	-	1	-	-	-	-
Falkland Islands	3	1	-	-	-	-	-	-	1	1	-
Born on ship/plane	2	-	-	2	-	-	-	-	-	-	-
Cocos Islands	1	-	-	-	-	-	-	-	1	-	-
Pitcairn Islands	1	-	-	-	-	-	-	-	-	-	1
French Southern and Antarctic Lands	0	-	-	-	-	-	-	-	-	-	-
Total	4,682,536	1,536,483	1,827,167	973,977	904,292	804,416	720,461	915,900	798,378	654,451	646,568

===== 1980s =====
Persons obtaining lawful permanent resident status by region and selected country of last residence (1980–1989 fiscal years)
Region or country of last residence	1980–1989	%
Mexico	1,009,586	16.17%
Philippines	502,056	8.04%
South Korea	322,708	5.17%
India	231,649	3.71%
Dominican Republic	221,552	3.55%
Vietnam	200,632	3.21%
Jamaica	193,874	3.1%
China	170,897	2.74%
Canada	156,313	2.5%
United Kingdom	153,644	2.46%
El Salvador	137,418	2.2%
Cuba	132,552	2.12%
Haiti	121,406	1.94%
Taiwan	119,051	1.91%
Hong Kong	112,132	1.8%
Colombia	105,494	1.69%
Iran	98,141	1.57%
Guyana	85,886	1.38%
West Germany	85,752	1.37%
Poland	63,483	1.02%
Guatemala	58,847	0.94%
Italy	55,562	0.89%
Peru	49,958	0.8%
Ecuador	48,015	0.77%
Japan	44,150	0.71%
Israel	43,669	0.7%
Portugal	42,685	0.68%
Honduras	39,071	0.63%
Greece	37,729	0.6%
Russia	33,311	0.53%
Panama	32,957	0.53%
France	32,894	0.53%
Nicaragua	31,102	0.5%
Jordan	28,928	0.46%
Egypt	26,744	0.43%
Costa Rica	25,017	0.4%
Romania	24,753	0.4%
Argentina	23,442	0.38%
Brazil	22,944	0.37%
Spain	22,783	0.36%
Venezuela	22,405	0.36%
Ireland	22,210	0.36%
Chile	19,749	0.32%
Turkey	19,208	0.31%
Australia	16,901	0.27%
Yugoslavia	16,267	0.26%
South Africa	15,505	0.25%
Austria	15,374	0.25%
Belize	14,964	0.24%
Syria	14,534	0.23%
Ethiopia	12,927	0.21%
Netherlands	11,234	0.18%
Sweden	10,106	0.16%
Bolivia	9,798	0.16%
Switzerland	8,316	0.13%
Uruguay	7,235	0.12%
Belgium	7,028	0.11%
Liberia	6,420	0.1%
New Zealand	6,129	0.1%
Czechoslovakia	5,678	0.09%
Hungary	5,063	0.08%
Denmark	4,847	0.08%
Norway	3,835	0.06%
Paraguay	3,518	0.06%
Morocco	3,471	0.06%
Finland	2,569	0.04%
Suriname	1,357	0.02%
Bulgaria	1,124	0.02%
Other Americas	83	0%
Other South American	2	0%
Total	6,244,379	100.00%

===== 1970s =====
Persons obtaining lawful permanent resident status by region and selected country of last residence (1970–1979 fiscal years)
Region and country of last residence	1970 to 1979	%
Mexico	621,218	14.62%
Philippines	337,726	7.95%
Cuba	256,497	6.04%
South Korea	241,192	5.68%
Canada	179,267	4.22%
Italy	150,031	3.53%
India	148,018	3.48%
Dominican Republic	139,249	3.28%
United Kingdom	133,218	3.14%
Jamaica	130,226	3.07%
South Vietnam	121,716	2.87%
Hong Kong	117,350	2.76%
Portugal	104,754	2.47%
Greece	102,370	2.41%
Taiwan	83,155	1.96%
West Germany	77,142	1.82%
Africa	71,405	1.68%
Colombia	71,265	1.68%
Haiti	55,166	1.3%
Japan	52,812	1.24%
Ecuador	47,464	1.12%
Spain	41,718	0.98%
Guyana	38,278	0.9%
Israel	36,306	0.85%
Iran	33,763	0.79%
Poland	33,699	0.79%
Yugoslavia	31,862	0.75%
Argentina	30,303	0.71%
El Salvador	29,428	0.69%
Russia	28,132	0.66%
France	27,018	0.64%
Jordan	25,541	0.6%
Peru	25,311	0.6%
Guatemala	23,837	0.56%
Egypt	23,543	0.55%
Panama	21,395	0.5%
Australia	18,708	0.44%
Brazil	18,600	0.44%
China	17,627	0.41%
Honduras	15,653	0.37%
Chile	15,032	0.35%
Austria	14,239	0.34%
Costa Rica	12,405	0.29%
Turkey	12,209	0.29%
Ireland	11,461	0.27%
Venezuela	11,007	0.26%
Nicaragua	10,911	0.26%
Romania	10,774	0.25%
Netherlands	10,373	0.24%
South Africa	10,002	0.24%
Switzerland	8,536	0.2%
Uruguay	8,416	0.2%
Syria	8,086	0.19%
Belize	6,747	0.16%
Sweden	6,371	0.15%
Hungary	6,148	0.14%
Czechoslovakia	5,654	0.13%
Bolivia	5,635	0.13%
Belgium	5,413	0.13%
New Zealand	5,018	0.12%
Denmark	4,405	0.1%
Norway	3,927	0.09%
Finland	2,829	0.07%
Ethiopia	2,588	0.06%
Liberia	2,391	0.06%
Morocco	1,967	0.05%
Paraguay	1,486	0.03%
Bulgaria	1,011	0.02%
Suriname	714	0.02%
Other South America	18	0%
Total	4,248,203	100.00%

===== 1960s =====
Immigrant arrivals by country of birth (1960–1969)
1. Mexico (13.8%)
2. Canada (13.5%)
3. United Kingdom (6.85%)
4. West Germany (6.52%)
5. Cuba (6.29%)
6. Italy (6.23%)
7. Dominican Republic (2.60%)
8. Greece (2.31%)
9. Philippines (2.20%)
10. Other (39.8%)

Persons obtaining lawful permanent resident status by region and selected country of last residence (1960–1969 fiscal years)
Region and country of last residence	1960 to 1969	%
Mexico	441,824	13.75%
Canada	433,128	13.48%
United Kingdom	220,213	6.85%
West Germany	209,616	6.52%
Cuba	202,030	6.29%
Italy	200,111	6.23%
Dominican Republic	83,552	2.6%
Greece	74,173	2.31%
Philippines	70,660	2.2%
Portugal	70,568	2.2%
Colombia	68,371	2.13%
Hong Kong	67,047	2.09%
Jamaica	62,218	1.94%
Poland	55,773	1.74%
Argentina	49,384	1.54%
France	46,975	1.46%
Japan	40,956	1.27%
Spain	40,793	1.27%
Netherlands	37,918	1.18%
Ireland	37,788	1.18%
Ecuador	34,107	1.06%
Israel	30,911	0.96%
Brazil	29,238	0.91%
Haiti	28,992	0.9%
South Korea	27,048	0.84%
Panama	22,177	0.69%
Venezuela	20,758	0.65%
Peru	19,783	0.62%
Switzerland	19,193	0.6%
Sweden	18,779	0.58%
India	18,638	0.58%
Yugoslavia	17,990	0.56%
Costa Rica	17,975	0.56%
Austria	17,571	0.55%
Norway	17,371	0.54%
Taiwan	15,657	0.49%
Honduras	15,087	0.47%
Australia	14,986	0.47%
El Salvador	14,405	0.45%
Guatemala	14,357	0.45%
China	14,060	0.44%
Chile	12,384	0.39%
Nicaragua	10,383	0.32%
Hungary	10,019	0.31%
Denmark	9,797	0.3%
Belgium	9,647	0.3%
Turkey	9,464	0.29%
Jordan	9,230	0.29%
Iran	9,059	0.28%
Bolivia	6,205	0.19%
United Arab Republic	5,581	0.17%
Guyana	4,546	0.14%
South Africa	4,360	0.14%
Finland	4,310	0.13%
Belize	4,185	0.13%
Uruguay	4,089	0.13%
New Zealand	3,775	0.12%
South Vietnam	2,949	0.09%
Morocco	2,880	0.09%
Czechoslovakia	2,758	0.09%
Syria	2,432	0.08%
Romania	2,339	0.07%
Russia	2,329	0.07%
Paraguay	1,249	0.04%
Liberia	841	0.03%
Ethiopia	804	0.03%
Suriname	612	0.02%
Bulgaria	598	0.02%
Not specified	119	0%
Total	3,213,749	100.00%

===== 1950s =====
Immigrant arrivals by country of birth (1950–1959)
1. West Germany (23.1%)
2. Canada (14.1%)
3. Mexico (11.0%)
4. United Kingdom (7.83%)
5. Italy (7.56%)
6. Austria (3.26%)
7. Cuba (2.93%)
8. France (2.01%)
9. Ireland (1.89%)
10. Other (26.4%)

Persons obtaining lawful permanent resident status by region and selected country of last residence (1950–1959 fiscal years)
Country or region of last residence	1950 to 1959	%
West Germany	576,905	23.08%
Canada	353,169	14.13%
Mexico	273,847	10.96%
United Kingdom	195,709	7.83%
Italy	189,061	7.56%
Austria	81,354	3.26%
Cuba	73,221	2.93%
France	50,113	2.01%
Ireland	47,189	1.89%
Netherlands	46,703	1.87%
Greece	45,153	1.81%
Japan	41,968	1.68%
Hungary	31,661	1.27%
Norway	22,813	0.91%
Sweden	21,418	0.86%
Israel	21,376	0.86%
Belgium	18,885	0.76%
Switzerland	17,577	0.7%
Philippines	17,245	0.69%
Argentina	16,346	0.65%
Colombia	15,567	0.62%
Portugal	13,928	0.56%
Hong Kong	13,781	0.55%
Panama	12,601	0.5%
Brazil	11,547	0.46%
Denmark	10,918	0.44%
Dominican Republic	10,219	0.41%
Venezuela	9,927	0.4%
China	8,836	0.35%
Ecuador	8,574	0.34%
Australia	8,275	0.33%
Nicaragua	7,812	0.31%
Jamaica	7,397	0.3%
Yugoslavia	6,966	0.28%
Spain	6,880	0.28%
Poland	6,498	0.26%
Peru	5,980	0.24%
Honduras	5,320	0.21%
El Salvador	5,094	0.2%
Finland	4,923	0.2%
Jordan	4,919	0.2%
South Korea	4,845	0.19%
Chile	4,669	0.19%
Guatemala	4,197	0.17%
Costa Rica	4,044	0.16%
Haiti	3,787	0.15%
Morocco	3,293	0.13%
Iran	3,195	0.13%
Turkey	2,980	0.12%
Bolivia	2,759	0.11%
South Africa	2,278	0.09%
Egypt	1,996	0.08%
India	1,922	0.08%
New Zealand	1,799	0.07%
Czechoslovakia	1,624	0.06%
Belize	1,133	0.05%
Guyana	1,131	0.05%
Syria	1,091	0.04%
Uruguay	1,026	0.04%
Romania	914	0.04%
Taiwan	721	0.03%
Paraguay	576	0.02%
Russia	453	0.02%
Ethiopia	302	0.01%
Suriname	299	0.01%
South Vietnam	290	0.01%
Liberia	289	0.01%
Bulgaria	97	0%
Total	2,499,268	100.00%

===== 1940s =====
Immigrant arrivals by country of birth (1940–1949)
1. Canada (18.8%)
2. United Kingdom (15.4%)
3. Germany (13.9%)
4. Mexico (6.56%)
5. Italy (5.90%)
6. France (4.31%)
7. Cuba (3.03%)
8. China (1.88%)
9. Ireland (1.83%)
10. Other (28.4%)

Persons obtaining lawful permanent resident status by region and selected country of last residence (1940–1949 fiscal years)
Region or country of last residence	1940 to 1949	%
Canada	160,911	18.78%
United Kingdom	131,794	15.39%
Germany	119,403	13.94%
Mexico	56,158	6.56%
Italy	50,509	5.9%
France	36,954	4.31%
Cuba	25,976	3.03%
China	16,072	1.88%
Ireland	15,701	1.83%
Netherlands	13,877	1.62%
Belgium	12,473	1.46%
Australia	11,201	1.31%
Switzerland	9,904	1.16%
Sweden	9,000	1.05%
Greece	8,605	1%
Austria	8,496	0.99%
Czechoslovakia	8,475	0.99%
Norway	8,326	0.97%
Poland	7,774	0.91%
Portugal	6,765	0.79%
Panama	5,282	0.62%
Hungary	5,181	0.6%
El Salvador	4,885	0.57%
Dominican Republic	4,802	0.56%
Denmark	4,549	0.53%
Nicaragua	4,393	0.51%
Philippines	4,099	0.48%
Brazil	3,653	0.43%
Colombia	3,454	0.4%
Argentina	3,108	0.36%
Spain	2,774	0.32%
New Zealand	2,351	0.27%
Finland	2,230	0.26%
Ecuador	2,207	0.26%
Venezuela	2,182	0.25%
Yugoslavia	2,039	0.24%
Costa Rica	1,965	0.23%
Honduras	1,874	0.22%
India	1,692	0.2%
Egypt	1,613	0.19%
Japan	1,557	0.18%
Morocco	1,463	0.17%
Chile	1,320	0.15%
Guatemala	1,303	0.15%
Peru	1,273	0.15%
Romania	1,254	0.15%
Syria	1,179	0.14%
Iran	1,144	0.13%
Bulgaria	1,022	0.12%
Bolivia	893	0.1%
Haiti	823	0.1%
Turkey	754	0.09%
Uruguay	754	0.09%
Russia	605	0.07%
Guyana	596	0.07%
South Africa	449	0.05%
Belize	433	0.05%
Suriname	130	0.02%
Israel	98	0.01%
Paraguay	85	0.01%
South Korea	83	0.01%
Liberia	37	0%
Ethiopia	28	0%
Transjordan	3	0%
Total	856,608	100.00%

===== 1930s =====
Immigrant arrivals by country of birth (1930–1939)
1. Canada and Newfoundland (23.3%)
2. Germany (16.8%)
3. Italy (12.2%)
4. United Kingdom (8.84%)
5. Mexico (4.68%)
6. Irish Free State (4.03%)
7. Poland (3.78%)
8. Czechoslovakia (2.54%)
9. France (1.97%)
10. Other (21.9%)

Persons obtaining lawful permanent resident status by region and selected country of last residence (1930–1939 fiscal years)
Country or region of last residence	1930 to 1939	%
Canada and Newfoundland	162,703	23.26%
Germany	117,736	16.83%
Italy	85,053	12.16%
United Kingdom	61,813	8.84%
Mexico	32,709	4.68%
Irish Free State	28,195	4.03%
Poland	26,460	3.78%
Czechoslovakia	17,757	2.54%
France	13,761	1.97%
Cuba	10,641	1.52%
Greece	10,599	1.52%
Other European	9,068	1.3%
Netherlands	7,791	1.11%
Hungary	7,224	1.03%
Yugoslavia	6,920	0.99%
Norway	6,901	0.99%
Central America	6,840	0.98%
Austria	6,678	0.95%
Sweden	6,551	0.94%
Other Caribbean	6,039	0.86%
Other Asian	6,024	0.86%
Switzerland	5,990	0.86%
China	5,874	0.84%
Romania	5,264	0.75%
Belgium	4,013	0.57%
Spain	3,669	0.52%
Portugal	3,518	0.5%
Denmark	3,470	0.5%
Japan	2,683	0.38%
Other South American	2,647	0.38%
Russia	2,473	0.35%
Finland	2,438	0.35%
Australia	2,260	0.32%
Syria	2,188	0.31%
Panama	1,774	0.25%
Other Central American	1,576	0.23%
Brazil	1,468	0.21%
Argentina	1,397	0.2%
Venezuela	1,360	0.19%
Turkey	1,314	0.19%
Colombia	1,278	0.18%
Dominican Republic	1,165	0.17%
Bulgaria	1,062	0.15%
Other African	872	0.12%
Honduras	809	0.12%
New Zealand	790	0.11%
Egypt	781	0.11%
El Salvador	712	0.1%
Guatemala	632	0.09%
Costa Rica	580	0.08%
Chile	568	0.08%
Nicaragua	564	0.08%
India	554	0.08%
Peru	460	0.07%
Philippines	457	0.07%
Ecuador	320	0.05%
South Africa	312	0.04%
Haiti	207	0.03%
Persia	198	0.03%
Belize	193	0.03%
Guyana	193	0.03%
Other Oceania	190	0.03%
Uruguay	153	0.02%
Morocco	110	0.02%
Bolivia	77	0.01%
Paraguay	36	0.01%
Liberia	35	0.01%
Suriname	33	0%
Other America	25	0%
Ethiopia	10	0%
Total	699,375	100.00%

===== 1920s =====
Immigrant arrivals by country of birth (1920–1929)
1. Canada and Newfoundland (22.1%)
2. Italy (12.3%)
3. Mexico (11.6%)
4. Germany (9.00%)
5. United Kingdom (7.98%)
6. Poland (5.22%)
7. Irish Free State (4.69%)
8. Czechoslovakia (2.36%)
9. Sweden (2.33%)
10. Other (22.4%)

Persons obtaining lawful permanent resident status by region and selected country of last residence (1920–1929 fiscal years)
Region and country of last residence	1920 to 1929	%
Canada and Newfoundland	949,286	22.1%
Italy	528,133	12.3%
Mexico	498,945	11.62%
Germany	386,634	9%
United Kingdom	342,762	7.98%
Poland	224,420	5.22%
Irish Free State	201,644	4.69%
Czechoslovakia	101,182	2.36%
Sweden	100,002	2.33%
Other Caribbean	70,713	1.65%
Norway	70,327	1.64%
Romania	67,810	1.58%
Russian SFSR	61,604	1.43%
Greece	60,774	1.41%
France	54,842	1.28%
Yugoslavia	49,215	1.15%
Spain	47,109	1.1%
Portugal	44,829	1.04%
Japan	42,057	0.98%
Turkey	40,374	0.94%
Other South America	38,398	0.89%
Denmark	34,406	0.8%
Switzerland	31,772	0.74%
Austria	31,392	0.73%
China	30,648	0.71%
Hungary	29,499	0.69%
Netherlands	29,397	0.68%
Belgium	21,511	0.5%
Other European	21,330	0.5%
Finland	16,922	0.39%
Other Central American	16,226	0.38%
Cuba	12,769	0.3%
Australia	8,404	0.2%
Other Asia	6,070	0.14%
Syria	5,307	0.12%
Other African	5,299	0.12%
Brazil	4,627	0.11%
Bulgaria	2,824	0.07%
India	2,076	0.05%
Egypt	1,063	0.02%
Not specified	930	0.02%
New Zealand	935	0.02%
Other Oceanian	521	0.01%
Belize	285	0.01%
Persia	208	0%
Total	4,295,510	100.00%

===== 1910s =====
Immigrant arrivals by country of birth (1910–1919)
1. Italy (19.4%)
2. Russian SFSR (17.4%)
3. Canada and Newfoundland (11.2%)
4. Austria (9.28%)
5. Hungary (8.91%)
6. United Kingdom (8.48%)
7. Greece (3.12%)
8. Mexico (2.92%)
9. Germany (2.74%)
10. Other (16.6%)

Persons obtaining lawful permanent resident status by region and selected country of last residence (1910–1919 fiscal years)
Region and country of last residence	1910 to 1919	%
Italy	1,229,916	19.38%
Russian SFSR	1,106,998	17.44%
Canada and Newfoundland	708,715	11.17%
Austria	589,174	9.28%
Hungary	565,553	8.91%
United Kingdom	538,323 (Note: 166,445 from Ireland and 371,878 from the rest of the United Kingdom.)	8.48%
Greece	198,108	3.12%
Mexico	185,334	2.92%
Germany	174,227	2.74%
Ottoman Empire	160,717	2.53%
Caribbean	120,860	1.9%
Sweden	112,957	1.78%
Portugal	82,489	1.3%
Norway	79,488	1.25%
Japan	77,125	1.22%
France	60,335	0.95%
Spain	53,262	0.84%
Netherlands	46,065	0.73%
Denmark	45,830	0.72%
South American	39,938	0.63%
Belgium	32,574	0.51%
Bulgaria	27,180	0.43%
Switzerland	22,839	0.36%
China	20,916	0.33%
Other Central American	15,652	0.25%
Romania	13,566	0.21%
Australia	11,280	0.18%
African	8,867	0.14%
Other Asian	7,500	0.12%
Other European	6,527	0.1%
India	3,478	0.05%
Other Oceanian	1,059	0.02%
Not specified	488	0.01%
Belize	40	0%
Total	6,347,380	100.00%

===== 1900s =====
Immigrant arrivals by country of birth (1900–1909)
1. Austria-Hungary (24.4%)
2. Italy (23.5%)
3. Russia (18.3%)
4. United Kingdom (9.93%)
5. Germany (4.01%)
6. Sweden (2.98%)
7. Norway (2.23%)
8. Greece (1.77%)
9. Japan (1.70%)
10. Other (11.1%)

Persons obtaining lawful permanent resident status by region and selected country of last residence (1900–1909 fiscal years)
Region and country of last residence	1900 to 1909	%
Austria-Hungary	2,001,376	24.4%
Italy	1,930,475	23.54%
Russia	1,501,301	18.3%
United Kingdom	814,458 (Note: 344,940 from Ireland and 469,518 from the rest of the United Kingdom.)	9.93%
Germany	328,722	4.01%
Sweden	244,439	2.98%
Norway	182,542	2.23%
Greece	145,402	1.77%
Japan	139,712	1.7%
Ottoman Empire	127,999	1.56%
Canada and Newfoundland	123,067	1.5%
Caribbean	100,960	1.23%
France	67,735	0.83%
Portugal	65,154	0.79%
Denmark	61,227	0.75%
Romania	57,322	0.7%
Netherlands	42,463	0.52%
Belgium	37,429	0.46%
Not specified	33,493	0.41%
Bulgaria	34,651	0.42%
Switzerland	32,541	0.4%
Mexico	31,188	0.38%
Spain	24,818	0.3%
China	19,884	0.24%
South American	15,253	0.19%
Australia	11,191	0.14%
Other Asian	9,215	0.11%
Other Central American	6,758	0.08%
African	6,326	0.08%
India	3,026	0.04%
Philippines	605	0.01%
Belize	583	0.01%
Other European	514	0.01%
Other Oceanian	486	0.01%
Total	8,202,388	100.00%

==== 19th-century ====
===== 1890s =====
Persons obtaining lawful permanent resident status by region and selected country of last residence (1890–1899 fiscal years)
Country	Number	%
United Kingdom	734,571 (Note: 328,759 from Great Britain and 405,710 from Ireland.)	19.88%
Italy	603,761	16.34%
Germany	579,072	15.67%
Russia	557,894 (Note: 36,719 from Finland, 107,793 from Poland, and 413,382 from the rest of the Russian Empire.)	15.1%
Austria-Hungary	534,059	14.46%
Sweden–Norway	334,058 (Note: 237,248 from Sweden and 96,810 from Norway.)	9.04%
Denmark	56,671	1.53%
Switzerland	37,020	1%
France	35,616	0.96%
Netherlands	29,349	0.79%
Ottoman Empire	27,510	0.74%
Portugal	25,874	0.7%
Cuba	23,669	0.64%
Belgium	19,642	0.53%
China	15,268	0.41%
Japan	13,998	0.38%
Greece	12,732	0.34%
Other Caribbean	7,892	0.21%
Romania	6,808	0.18%
Other Asian	4,381	0.12%
Australia	3,098	0.08%
Canada and Newfoundland	2,668	0.07%
Other Central America	622	0.02%
Colombia	607	0.02%
Mexico	734	0.02%
Other South American	305	0.01%
Jamaica	223	0.01%
Other European	145	0%
Uruguay	144	0%
India	102	0%
Haiti	101	0%
Brazil	92	0%
Peru	79	0%
Chile	66	0%
Bulgaria	52	0%
Egypt	51	0%
Argentina	36	0%
Ecuador	33	0%
Guiana	27	0%
Persia	26	0%
Belize	25	0%
Philippines	19	0%
New Zealand	12	0%
Liberia	9	0%
Morocco	9	0%
South Africa	9	0%
Guatemala	9	0%
El Salvador	7	0%
Costa Rica	4	0%
Honduras	4	0%
Nicaragua	3	0%
Not specified	14,112	0.38%
Total	3,694,294	100%

===== 1880s =====
Persons obtaining lawful permanent resident status by region and selected country of last residence (1880–1889 fiscal years)
Country	Number	%
United Kingdom	1,484,961 (Note: 810,900 from Great Britain and 674,061 from Ireland.)	28.29%
Germany	1,445,181	27.53%
Canada and Newfoundland	492,508	9.38%
Sweden–Norway	586,441 (Note: 401,330 from Sweden and 185,111 from Norway.)	11.17%
Austria-Hungary	314,787	6%
Italy	267,660	5.1%
Russia	225,608 (Note: 42,910 from Poland, 9,617 from Finland, and 173,081 from the rest of the Russian Empire.)	4.3%
Denmark	85,342	1.63%
Switzerland	81,151	1.55%
China	65,797	1.25%
Netherlands	52,715	1%
France	48,193	0.92%
Cuba	20,134	0.38%
Belgium	18,738	0.36%
Portugal	15,189	0.29%
Australia	7,250	0.14%
Other Caribbean	6,987	0.13%
Romania	5,842	0.11%
Other Americas	5,019	0.1%
Spain	3,999	0.08%
Ottoman Empire	2,478	0.05%
Mexico	2,405	0.05%
Greece	1,807	0.03%
Japan	1,583	0.03%
Colombia	1,210	0.02%
Other Europe	1,070	0.02%
Other Asia	888	0.02%
Other Africa	567	0.01%
Central America	359	0.01%
Jamaica	355	0.01%
Other Central America	270	0.01%
Venezuela	248	0%
India	247	0%
Brazil	199	0%
Egypt	145	0%
Syria	140	0%
Haiti	124	0%
Belize	80	0%
Other South American	78	0%
Other Oceanian	70	0%
Guiana	68	0%
Argentina	64	0%
Chile	44	0%
Peru	25	0%
South Africa	23	0%
New Zealand	21	0%
Liberia	21	0%
Iran	18	0%
Ecuador	14	0%
Morocco	12	0%
Guatemala	3	0%
Honduras	4	0%
Uruguay	4	0%
Costa Rica	1	0%
Nicaragua	1	0%
Philippines	1	0%
Not specified	778	0.01%
Total	5,248,568	100%

===== 1870s =====
Persons obtaining lawful permanent resident status by region and selected country of last residence (1870–1879 fiscal years)
Country	Number	%
United Kingdom	1,000,711 (Note: 422,264 from Ireland and 578,447 from the rest of the United Kingdom.)	36.49%
Germany	751,769	27.42%
Canada and Newfoundland	323,974	11.81%
Sweden–Norway	178,823 (Note: 90,179 from Sweden and 88,644 from Norway.)	6.52%
China	133,139	4.86%
France	71,901	2.62%
Austria-Hungary	60,127	2.19%
Italy	46,296	1.69%
Russia	46,279 (Note: 11,016 from Poland, 286 from Finland, and 34,977 from the rest of the Russian Empire.)	1.69%
Denmark	29,278	1.07%
Switzerland	25,212	0.92%
Netherlands	14,267	0.52%
Portugal	13,990	0.51%
Australia	8,933	0.33%
Cuba	8,705	0.32%
Belgium	6,991	0.25%
Spain	5,571	0.2%
Other Caribbean	5,481	0.2%
Mexico	5,133	0.19%
Other Americas	879	0.03%
Other European	626	0.02%
Ottoman Empire	382	0.01%
Other African	297	0.01%
Jamaica	257	0.01%
Brazil	219	0.01%
Colombia	196	0.01%
Japan	193	0.01%
Venezuela	190	0.01%
India	166	0.01%
Other Asian	163	0.01%
Haiti	149	0.01%
Other Central American	147	0.01%
Peru	127	0%
Other Oceanian	122	0%
Other South American	96	0%
Guiana	95	0%
Chile	92	0%
Argentina	58	0%
Liberia	52	0%
South Africa	48	0%
New Zealand	39	0%
Egypt	29	0%
Belize	26	0%
Uruguay	22	0%
Persia	17	0%
Morocco	15	0%
Honduras	11	0%
Guatemala	10	0%
Ecuador	7	0%
Syria	7	0%
Bolivia	5	0%
Costa Rica	4	0%
Philippines	4	0%
El Salvador	3	0%
Paraguay	2	0%
Nicaragua	1	0%
Not specified	592	0.02%
Total	2,742,137	100%

===== 1860s =====
Persons obtaining lawful permanent resident status by region and selected country of last residence (1860–1869 fiscal years)
Country	Number	%
United Kingdom	960,375 (Note: 427,419 from Ireland and 532,956 from the rest of the United Kingdom.)	46.14%
Germany	723,734	34.77%
Canada and Newfoundland	117,975	5.67%
Sweden–Norway	82,937	3.98%
China	54,028	2.6%
France	35,938	1.73%
Switzerland	21,124	1.01%
Denmark	13,553	0.65%
Italy	9,853	0.47%
Netherlands	8,387	0.4%
Spain	6,970	0.33%
Belgium	5,785	0.28%
Other Caribbean	5,250	0.25%
Portugal	4,741	0.23%
Russia	3,556 (Note: 1,886 from Poland, 3 from Finland, and 1,667 from the rest of the Russian Empire.)	0.17%
Cuba	3,420	0.16%
Austria-Hungary	3,375	0.16%
Mexico	1,957	0.09%
Other South American	1,358	0.07%
Other African	328	0.02%
Ottoman Empire	129	0.01%
Japan	138	0.01%
Australia	96	0%
South Africa	79	0%
Haiti	78	0%
Jamaica	61	0%
Other Central American	58	0%
Other Asian	57	0%
Greece	51	0%
India	50	0%
Liberia	43	0%
Guiana	41	0%
Venezuela	36	0%
Peru	35	0%
Brazil	32	0%
Chile	25	0%
Other European	10	0%
New Zealand	6	0%
Argentina	7	0%
Egypt	8	0%
Belize	9	0%
Other Oceanian	5	0%
Persia	4	0%
Costa Rica	2	0%
Colombia	2	0%
Syria	2	0%
Guatemala	1	0%
Not specified	15,472	0.74%
Total	2,081,261	100%

===== 1850s =====
Persons obtaining lawful permanent resident status by region and selected country of last residence (1850–1859 fiscal years)
Country	Number	%
United Kingdom	1,474,808 (Note: 1,029,486 from Ireland and 445,322 from the rest of the United Kingdom.)	52.4%
Germany	976,072	34.68%
Canada	64,171	2.28%
France	81,778	2.91%
China	35,933	1.28%
Switzerland	24,423	0.87%
Sweden–Norway	22,202	0.79%
Caribbean	12,447	0.44%
Netherlands	11,122	0.4%
Spain	8,803	0.31%
Italy	8,643	0.31%
Belgium	5,765	0.2%
Portugal	4,218	0.15%
Other South American	3,569	0.13%
Mexico	3,446	0.12%
Denmark	3,227	0.11%
Russia	1,510 (Note: 1,087 from Poland and 423 from the rest of the Russian Empire.)	0.05%
Central American	512	0.02%
Australia	104	0%
Ottoman Empire	94	0%
Other African	92	0%
India	42	0%
Greece	32	0%
Other European	14	0%
Other Asian	11	0%
Liberia	7	0%
Egypt	5	0%
Other Oceanian	4	0%
New Zealand	2	0%
Not specified	71,442	2.54%
Total	2,814,554	100%

===== 1840s =====
Persons obtaining lawful permanent resident status by region and selected country of last residence (1840–1849 fiscal years)
Country	Number	%
United Kingdom	874,717 (Note: 656,145 from Ireland and 218,572 from the rest of the United Kingdom.)	61.28%
Germany	385,434	27%
France	75,300	5.28%
Canada	34,285	2.4%
Sweden–Norway	12,389	0.87%
Caribbean	11,803	0.83%
Netherlands	7,624	0.53%
Switzerland	4,819	0.34%
Belgium	3,996	0.28%
Mexico	3,069	0.22%
Spain	1,917	0.13%
Italy	1,476	0.1%
Other South American	1,062	0.07%
Denmark	671	0.05%
Russia	625 (Note: 105 from Poland and 520 from the rest of the Russian Empire.)	0.04%
Portugal	359	0.03%
Other Central American	297	0.02%
Asia	121	0.01%
Other European	79	0.01%
Other African	61	0%
Ottoman Empire	45	0%
India	33	0%
China	32	0%
Greece	17	0%
Persia	7	0%
Liberia	5	0%
Other Asian	4	0%
Australia	2	0%
Other Oceanian	1	0%
Morocco	1	0%
Not specified	7,196	0.5%
Total	1,427,337	100%

===== 1830s =====
Persons obtaining lawful permanent resident status by region and selected country of last residence (1830–1839 fiscal years)
Country	Number	%
United Kingdom	245,022 (Note: 170,672 from Ireland and 74,350 from the rest of the United Kingdom.)	45.51%
Germany	124,726	23.17%
France	39,330	7.31%
Caribbean	11,792	2.19%
Canada	11,875	2.21%
Mexico	7,187	1.33%
Switzerland	4,430	0.82%
(Kingdom of the Two Sicilies) Italy	2,225	0.41%
Spain	2,016	0.37%
Netherlands	1,377	0.26%
Sweden–Norway	1,149	0.21%
Other South America	957	0.18%
Denmark	927	0.17%
Portugal	896	0.17%
Russia	646 (Note: 366 from Poland and 280 from the rest of the Russian Empire.)	0.12%
Other Central American	94	0.02%
Other African	54	0.01%
Greece	49	0.01%
Other European	40	0.01%
India	38	0.01%
Belgium	20	0%
Liberia	8	0%
Ottoman Empire	8	0%
China	8	0%
Other Americas	6	0%
Morocco	4	0%
Australia	1	0%
Other Asian	1	0%
Not specified	83,495	15.51%
Total	538,381	100%

===== 1820s =====
Persons obtaining lawful permanent resident status by region and selected country of last residence (1820–1829 fiscal years)
Country	Number	%
United Kingdom	77,953 (Note: 51,617 from Ireland and 26,336 from the rest of the United Kingdom.)	60.66%
Not specified	19,173	14.92%
France	7,694	5.99%
Germany	5,753	4.48%
Mexico	3,835	2.98%
Switzerland	3,148	2.45%
Caribbean	3,061	2.38%
Spain	2,866	2.23%
Canada	2,297	1.79%
Netherlands	1,105	0.86%
Italy	430	0.33%
South America	405	0.32%
Portugal	252	0.2%
Denmark	173	0.13%
Sweden–Norway	91	0.07%
Russia	86	0.07%
Central America	57	0.04%
Belgium	28	0.02%
Poland	19	0.01%
Ottoman Empire	19	0.01%
Other African	18	0.01%
Greece	17	0.01%
India	9	0.01%
Other European	3	0%
China	3	0%
Other Asian	3	0%
Australia	2	0%
Other Americas	1	0%
Liberia	1	0%
Total	128,502	100%

==== 18th century ====
===== Before 1790s =====
Immigrants by region and selected country of last residence (before 1790s)
Region/Country	Number
British Isles	425,500
Africa	360,000
England	230,000
Scots-Irish	135,000
Germany	103,000
Scotland	48,500
Ireland	8,000
Dutch Republic	6,000
Wales	4,000
France	3,000
Jewish	1,000
Sweden	1,000
Others	50,000
Total	950,000

== Naturalizations ==
Data is shown by the most current fiscal year.

=== By age and sex ===
This table lists the number of applications by age and sex for the 2022 fiscal year. In 2022 the sex of the largest number of naturalizations was female and the largest age cohort was the 35 to 39 cohort.

Year	Age	Sex			Total
Year	Age	Female	Male	Unknown	Total
2022	18–19	8,958	8,642	0	17,600
2022	20–24	37,332	34,013	0	71,345
2022	25–29	57,271	44,498	0	101,769
2022	30–34	71,955	56,783	0	128,738
2022	35–39	74,559	64,696	0	139,255
2022	40–44	62,887	57,150	2	120,039
2022	45–49	49,326	44,532	3	93,861
2022	50–54	43,812	37,441	4	81,257
2022	55–59	38,797	32,179	6	70,982
2022	60–64	29,551	24,104	7	53,662
2022	65–74	38,366	30,097	8	68,471
2022	75+	13,210	9,190	1	22,401
2022	Total	526,024	443,325	31	969,380

=== By admission class ===
	Class	2022
Major admission class	Immediate relatives of U.S. citizens	428,268
Major admission class	Employment-based preferences	270,284
Major admission class	Family-sponsored preferences	166,041
Major admission class	Asylum seekers	53,659
Major admission class	Refugees	29,423
Major admission class	Victims of crimes and their immediate relatives	9,871
Major admission class	Cancellation of removal	4,160
Major admission class	Diversity	1,567
Major admission class	Certain Iraqis and Afghans employed by U.S. government and their spouses and children	1,467
Major admission class	Victims of human trafficking	712
Major admission class	Parolees	14
Major admission class	Other	607
Major admission class	Total	1,018,349

== Lawful permanent residents ==
Data is shown by the most current fiscal year.

=== By marital status and sex ===
This table shows the number of persons who gained lawful permanent resident status in the newest fiscal year with data available. In the data source, it is rounded.

Year	Marital status	Sex			Total
Year	Marital status	Female	Male	Unknown	Total
2023	Married	383,360	302,210	180	685,750
2023	Single	196,090	206,100	30	402,220
2023	Widowed	28,260	3,850	10	32,120
2023	Divorced/separated	29,210	11,840	10	41,060
2023	Unknown	5,140	6,560	70	11,770
2023	Total	642,060	530,550	300	1,172,910

== Refugees ==
In 2024 there were an estimated 100,060 refugee applicants with an estimated 37,050 being classified as "Principal Applicants".

Data is shown by most recent fiscal year.

=== By sex ===
This table shows the number of arrivals by sex. Which sex is listed first is determined based on the number of admissions in the given fiscal year. Data is as of the most recent fiscal year and the data from 2024 is rounded.

Year	Sex	Total
2024	Female	50,410
2024	Male	49,650

=== By age ===
Displayed below is the number of refugee arrivals by age range. The data included is as of the most recent fiscal year which is 2024 and the data in this table is rounded as this is what the source reports.

Age range (in years)	Number
0-17	43,360
18-24	13,290
25-34	18,210
35-44	13,500
45-54	6,770
55-64	3,150
65+	1,760

=== By marital status ===
This shows the number of refugee arrivals by marital status including those classified as being "Principal applicants". This is regardless of sex or other factors. Those in a civil union or a common-law marriage as of the data are classified as being "Married" following what the data source reports. Data is rounded.

Year	Marital status	Relation			
Year	Marital status	Principal applicant	Spouses	Children	Other dependents
2024	Married	17,700	14,100	20	0
2024	Single	16,200	90	48,550	230
2024	Widowed	1,940	0	0	0
2024	Divorced/separated	1,210	10	0	0
2024	Unknown	0	0	0	0

== Asylees ==
=== Affirmative asylum ===
==== By continent ====
This table lists the number of people who were granted affirmative asylum by the region or continent based on their nationality. The data is listed is as of 2023 and the continents are arranged alphabetically. Data source:

Continent	Number
Africa	1,520
Asia	18,270
Europe	540
North America	860
Oceania	0
South America	1,050
Unknown	60

=== Defensive asylum ===
==== By continent ====
This table lists the number of people who were granted defensive asylum by the region or continent based on their nationality. The data is listed is as of 2023 and the continents are arranged alphabetically. Data source:

Continent	Number
Africa	2,770
Asia	10,280
Europe	2,910
North America	9,810
Oceania	10
South America	6,060
Unknown	210

== Illegal (or unauthorized) immigrants ==
In 2022, the United States Department of Homeland Security estimated the number of illegal immigrants (or unauthorized immigrants) to be 11,990,000 people.

=== By country by year ===
The table below lists the estimated number of illegal immigrants for the top 10 countries with the largest estimated number by country of birth and year in the thousands. There is no national census done on the legality of being in the United States of those born abroad. No data is available for 2001-2004 and 2020 while for 2010, 2015 and 2018 this table has the revised number. Source:

Country	2000	2005	2006	2007	2008	2009	2010	2011	2012	2013	2014	2015	2016	2017	2018	2019	2020	2022
Mexico	4,680	5,970	6,570	6,980	7,030	6,650	6,830	6,800	6,720	6,450	6,450	6,200	5,970	5,860	5,540	5,350	4,970	4,810
Guatemala	290	370	430	500	430	480	520	520	560	590	620	600	610	610	620	670	780	750
El Salvador	430	470	510	540	570	530	670	660	690	690	670	720	750	750	730	750	750	710
Honduras	160	180	280	280	300	320	380	380	360	390	390	420	430	500	450	450	550	560
Philippines	200	210	280	290	300	270	290	270	310	340	330	350	410	300	370	360	340	350
Venezuela	NA	NA	NA	60	50	50	50	50	60	50	40	80	100	120	190	220	260	320
Colombia	100	110	140	130	100	110	120	130	130	160	130	130	140	130	210	190	190	240
Brazil	100	170	210	190	180	150	150	150	130	110	110	100	110	150	190	180	190	230
India	120	280	210	220	160	200	270	240	260	320	390	450	560	490	480	390	340	220
China	190	230	170	290	220	120	300	280	210	190	230	320	420	410	390	330	270	210
Other countries	2,180	2,500	2,510	2,290	2,240	1,880	2,020	2,030	2,010	1,920	2,090	2,080	2,260	2,090	2,400	2,220	1,870	2,600

=== By state by year ===
This table lists the number of estimated illegal immigrants by state by year with the top ten highest estimated population of them regardless of which country they come from. No data is available for 2021 in Estimates of the Unauthorized Immigrant Population Residing in the United States: January 2018–January 2022 which is the source of information from 2018 to 2022.

State	2022	2020	2019	2018	2017	2016
California	2,600,000	2,410,000	2,620,000	2,640,000	2,790,000	2,860,000
Texas	2,060,000	1,900,000	1,950,000	1,950,000	1,870,000	1,910,000
Florida	590,000	610,000	650,000	680,000	610,000	610,000
New Jersey	490,000	400,000	390,000	460,000	450,000	420,000
Illinois	420,000	370,000	440,000	460,000	440,000	520,000
New York	410,000	370,000	510,000	600,000	620,000	630,000
North Carolina	360,000	360,000	340,000	360,000	320,000	360,000
Georgia	340,000	360,000	360,000	390,000	400,000	400,000
Washington	340,000	340,000	330,000	310,000	280,000	280,000
Arizona	290,000	340,000	330,000	340,000	340,000	330,000
Other/unknown	3,090,000	3,040,000	3,200,000	3,380,000	3,300,000	3,430,000
Total	10,990,000	10,510,000	11,110,000	11,570,000	11,410,000	11,750,000

=== DACA recipients ===
==== Number by age ====
This table lists the number of DACA recipients regardless of age as being at 578,680 in March 2023. Keep in mind this is being described as being a "rounded" number. The average age was 29.2 years old while the median was 29.

Age	Number (rounded)
Under 16	10
16 to 20	4,730
21 to 25	153,090
26 to 30	204,790
31 to 35	142,150
36 to 40	68,840
NA	5,070
Total	578,680

=== Immigration arrests ===
==== From Immigration and Customs enforcement (ICE) ====
===== By Fiscal year =====
This table looks at the number of immigration related arrests made by ICE by fiscal year regardless of country and area. Table source:

Fiscal year	Criminal conviction	Criminal charges pending	Other immigration violation	Total
2025 (so far)	14,842	7,886	3,878	26,606
2024	57,688	23,624	32,119	113,431
2023	53,766	20,056	96,768	170,590
2022	36,322	10,074	96,354	142,750
2021	36,619	8,813	28,650	216,832

== See also ==
- Immigration to the United States
- History of immigration to the United States
- Demographics of the United States
