= History of Canada (1960–1981) =

Canadian history between universal suffrage and the modern constitution of Canada

The history of Canada (1960–1981) refers to the period immediately following the prosperous 1950s until the new constitution of 1982, the Canada Act.

== Universal suffrage ==
In 1960, Prime Minister John Diefenbaker's government decided to permit all Status Indians to vote in federal elections. Since 1950, Status Indians had been allowed vote on the condition that they gave up their treaty rights and Indian status, defined in the Indian Act as "enfranchisement", or if they had fought in the First or Second World Wars. The Inuit and Métis were already able to vote at the time.

The Act to Amend the Canada Elections Act, which removed the discriminatory parts of Section 14, was made into law on March 31, 1960. The 1968 election would make Leonard Marchand the first Status Indian to serve as a member of parliament. Status Indians would not be legally allowed to vote in all provincial elections until Quebec enfranchised them in 1969.

== The new flag ==
Diefenbaker was succeeded by Lester B. Pearson in 1963, at a time of increasing political unrest in much of the Western world. In Canada the largest crises involved provincial rights, especially in Quebec, where nationalism had been increasing and was on the verge of violent explosion. Pearson recognized Quebec to be a "nation within the nation". One attempt at pacifying Quebec, and moving Canada away from the old British imperialism, was creating a new flag.

Lester Pearson's preferred choice for a new flag was nicknamed "the Pearson Pennant".

The old Red Ensign no longer reflected Canada's place in the world, and Pearson believed a new flag would help unite French and English Canada with truly Canadian symbols. After lengthy debates over numerous designs, the current maple leaf flag was adopted in 1965 and was somewhat quickly embraced by the public. Veterans of the First Two World Wars felt as though this change was wrong, as they and many of their friends and family members fought and died under the old flag. By the end of Lester B. Pearson's term, most of the controversy had ended, although some people remained upset. Famously, Diefenbaker, a staunch proponent of the Red Ensign, had both the Red Ensign and the Maple Leaf version on his casket following his death in 1979.

Fifteen years before, Quebec had replaced the British provincial flag with the current flag of Quebec, which was quickly embraced by Quebecers.

== The Quiet Revolution ==
The Quiet Revolution (or Révolution tranquille) began in Quebec when Jean Lesage became premier in 1960. It was, essentially, a peaceful nationalist movement to transform Quebec into a modern secular state. It was characterized by rapid secularization, the creation of a welfare state, and the transformation of the national identity among Francophone Quebecers (from Canadien français to the term Québécois).

== Expo 67 and Canadian Centennial ==
In 1967, the World's Fair was held in Montreal, Quebec, coinciding with the first Canadian Centennial. The fair opened April 28, 1967, with the theme "Man and his World" and became the best attended of all BIE-sanctioned world expositions until that time. Expo 67 raised the international profile of Montreal and Canada and instilled a sense of hopefulness and national pride in many Canadian citizens. Canadian nationalists like Pierre Berton would later refer to 1967 as Canada's "Last Good Year" before the country became divided over economic problems and Quebec sovereignty.

== The October crisis ==
Pierre Elliott Trudeau, himself a French Canadian, came to power in 1968. Quebec also produced a more radical nationalist group, the Front de libération du Québec, who since 1963 had been using terrorism in an attempt to make Quebec a sovereign nation. In October 1970, in response to the arrest of some of its members earlier in the year, the FLQ kidnapped James Cross and Pierre Laporte, later killing Laporte. Trudeau invoked the War Measures Act, declaring martial law in Quebec, and by the end of the year the kidnappers had all been arrested.

== Trudeau and the 1970s ==
Trudeau was a somewhat unconventional Prime Minister; he was more of a celebrity than previous leaders, and in the 1960s had been the centre of "Trudeaumania". He also did not blindly support the United States without consideration, especially over the Vietnam War and relations with the People's Republic of China and Cuba. Richard Nixon particularly disliked him.

Domestically, Trudeau had to deal with the aftermath of the October Crisis. The separatist movement was not aided by the violent Front de libération du Québec (FLQ), yet it still existed in a less radical form under Premier René Lévesque (1976–1985). Lévesque came to power as leader of the Parti Québécois, which wanted to make Quebec at least an autonomous society in Canada and at best an independent nation. A step towards this was taken in 1977 with the adoption of Bill 101, making French the only official language in the province.

== Canada and the Vietnam War ==
While Canada had participated extensively in the Korean War, it was officially a non-participant in the Vietnam War. Setting itself apart from America's Truman and Eisenhower Doctrines, Canada was involved in diplomatic efforts to discourage escalation of the conflict and set conditions that required a much greater level of multilateralism than existed for it to join the SEATO military pact and commit troops.

The war was generally unpopular among the public and the counterculture of the day had strong ties with American organizations like Students for a Democratic Society. Canadian anti-war activists encouraged American draftees to head north, offering them extensive counsel and assistance. Draft dodgers were generally accepted as immigrants by Canadian authorities, and as many as 125,000 Americans moved to Canada due to their opposition to the War. At least half of them are believed to have stayed permanently. This influx of young people helped Canada recover from the "brain drain" of the 1950s, and while in many ways the draft dodgers assimilated into Canadian society, they are considered to have had significant and lasting effects on the country.

Meanwhile, several thousand Canadians joined the U.S. military and served in Vietnam. Many of them became naturalized American citizens after the war, while those who returned to Canada never received official recognition from the Canadian government or military as veterans. Canada did deploy some peacekeeping troops to monitor ceasefire agreements during the conflict, and also sold a great deal of matériel to the United States. After the fall of Saigon in 1975, many Vietnamese refugees moved to Canada, establishing large communities in Vancouver and Toronto.

== National energy program ==
In 1973, world oil prices quadrupled due to the OAPEC oil embargo following the Yom Kippur War. Canada's province of Alberta had substantial oil reserves, whose extraction had long been controlled by American corporations. Elements of the government of Prime Minister Pierre Trudeau and the opposition New Democratic Party felt that these corporations geared most of their production to the American market, and sent their profits south. As a result, they believed, little of the benefit of rising oil prices went to Canadians. This view was not widely shared in the oil-producing province of Alberta.

A bill to create a publicly run oil company was introduced by the New Democratic Party in 1973, Trudeau's Liberals were then in a minority government and dependent upon the support of the NDP to stay in power. The idea also fit with Trudeau's economic nationalism. The NDP and the Liberals passed the bill over the opposition of the Progressive Conservative Party (PC) led by Robert Stanfield. Petro-Canada was given $1.5 billion in start-up money and easy access to new sources of capital. It was set up in Calgary, despite the hostility of that city's population and existing oil firms. The PCs, now led by Albertan Joe Clark, were opponents of the company and advocated breaking it up and selling it. The Tories were unable to proceed with these plans during their brief time in power in 1979–1980, however.

The company became popular outside Alberta as a symbol of Canadian nationalism. The federal government and Petro-Canada tried to reinforce this popularity nationwide (but especially in Calgary) through its prominent sponsorship of the city's successful 1988 Winter Olympics bid. It quickly grew to be one of the largest players in the traditional oil fields of the west as well as in the oil sands and the East Coast offshore oil fields.

The Liberals returned to power in 1980, energy policy was an important focus, and the sweeping National Energy Program was created. This expanded Petro-Canada, but it was detrimental to Alberta's economy. Inflation was out of control and interest rates were through the roof. Unemployment was epidemic in the eastern provinces where the Trudeau government had much of its political support. The NEP was designed to promote oil self-sufficiency for Canada, maintain the oil supply, particularly for the industrial base in eastern Canada, promote Canadian ownership of the energy industry, promote lower prices, promote exploration for oil in Canada, promote alternative energy sources, and increase government revenues from oil sales through a variety of taxes and agreements. The NEP's Petroleum Gas Revenue Tax (PGRT) instituted a double-taxation mechanism that did not apply to other commodities, such as gold and copper.

It is estimated that Alberta lost between $50 billion and $100 billion because of the NEP. The rationale for the program weakened when world oil prices began to decline in the early 1980s, leading to the start of a phased shut down by the new Minister of Energy, Mines and Resources Jean Chrétien. In the 1984 election the government of Brian Mulroney was elected with the support of western Canada after campaigning against the NEP. However, Mulroney did not eliminate the last vestiges of the program until two and a half years later at which time world oil prices had dropped below pre-1980s levels (as adjusted for inflation). This was a contributing factor to the creation of western Canada's Reform Party of Canada.

== The 1980 Quebec referendum ==
In 1980, the Parti Québécois launched a referendum on the question of sovereignty. The question actually asked whether Quebec should negotiate for sovereignty, not whether Quebec should simply declare independence, but it was vaguely worded and confused many voters. Trudeau, although it was not a federal referendum, supported the "no" side, promising constitutional reform. The "no" side won by a margin of 60% to 40% when the question was put to the voters on the 20th of May.

== Marathon of Hope ==
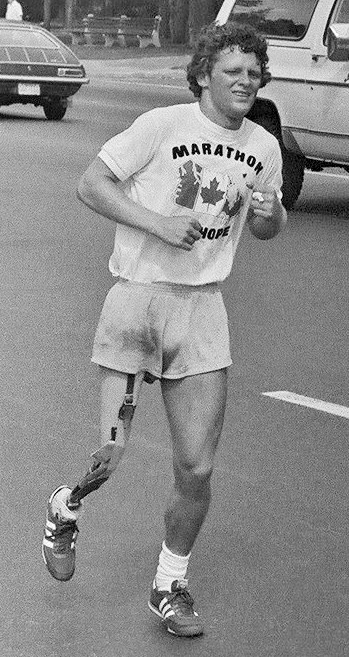
Terry Fox

Three years after losing his right leg to cancer at age 18, Terry Fox decided to run from coast to coast in order to raise money for cancer research. In creating the Marathon of Hope, his goal was to raise $1.00 from every Canadian citizen. The young athlete began by dipping his artificial leg in the Atlantic Ocean at St. John's, Newfoundland on April 12, 1980. He aimed to dip it again in the Pacific Ocean at Vancouver, British Columbia. His plan was to run an average of 42.195 kilometres (26.219 mi) a day, the distance of a typical marathon. Unfortunately, Fox could not finish his run. The cancer had spread to his lungs, and he was forced to abandon the course on September 1, 1980, just northeast of Thunder Bay, Ontario after 143 days. He had run 5,373 km (3,339 miles, or around 23.3 miles per day) through Newfoundland, Nova Scotia, Prince Edward Island, New Brunswick, Quebec, and Ontario. However, Fox was hailed as a national hero, made a Companion of the Order of Canada and his efforts have raised millions around the world for cancer research with Terry Fox Run events that have continued long after his early death.

== See also ==
- Heritage Minutes
- History of Canada
