= Joshua Key (soldier) =

American activist

- Born: 1978 (age 47–48); Guthrie, Oklahoma
- Military career
- Branch: United States Army (now deserted)
- Service years: 2003 -
- Rank: Private
- Conflicts: Iraq War
- Other work: various

Joshua Key is a United States Army deserter. Key fled while on leave from the Iraq War, and is a current resident of Canada. Along with Lawrence Hill, he is the co-author of The Deserter's Tale, a book chronicling his service in Iraq and his subsequent departure from military life.

== Personal life ==
Joshua Key was born in 1978 in Guthrie, Oklahoma, which is located just outside Oklahoma City.

At age 20, he married Brandi Johnston, with whom he has four children. She initially joined him in moving to Canada, but later divorced him and returned to the US with their children.

== Military service and desertion ==
In 2002, Key enlisted in the United States Army. He attended basic training and was stationed in Fort Carson, Colorado. He was deployed to the Middle East in the 2003 invasion of Iraq.

"Key served as a combat engineer for eight months in Iraq 2003." "Mr. Key had told the IRB that while in Iraq with a unit of combat engineers, he took part in at least 200 raids on civilian homes." When he returned home on leave in November 2003, he deserted the Army.

Key states he holds no regrets about deserting the US Army, as illustrated on the back cover of The Deserters Tale. In the book Key gives a short summary of his own life prior, during and after his tour of duty and subsequent desertion. In the book Key claims to have witnessed many troubling acts: systematic vandalism of Iraqi homes during house raids, murder of an Iraqi child, and sexual abuse of innocent women, all purportedly committed by American soldiers and officers.

After deserting the military, Key spent 14 months in hiding in the US before going to Canada.

== Life in Canada ==
Key fled to Toronto, Ontario, Canada on March 8, 2005, and 3 days later made a claim for asylum as a conscientious objector seeking refugee status.

=== First hearing at Canada's Immigration and Refugee Board ===
==== Negative IRB decision: October 20, 2006 ====
He had a hearing at Canada's Immigration and Refugee Board (IRB), represented by Jeffry House, but the Board rendered a negative decision on October 20, 2006. He appealed to the Federal Court.

==== Successful appeal: Canada's Federal Court Ruling of July 4, 2008 ====
On July 4, 2008, Key won a Federal Court appeal forcing the IRB to re-examine his claim for refugee status in Canada.

The IRB was ordered to take another look at Key's failed bid for asylum in an unprecedented court ruling that could affect scores of other U.S. soldiers, now in Canada, who have refused to fight in Iraq. In the decision the Federal Court found the IRB made mistakes in turning down Joshua Key's claim for asylum.

While the earlier board deemed him credible, it declined his claim for refugee status on the grounds he was not required to systematically commit war crimes. The earlier board rulings deemed that it was not important enough that he had to violate the Geneva Conventions. Federal Court Justice Robert Barnes disagreed with that earlier analysis. "Officially condoned military misconduct falling well short of a war crime may support a claim to refugee protection," Barnes wrote. Military action that "systematically degrades, abuses or humiliates" either combatants or non-combatants could provide such support, he said.

Prior to Justice Barnes' ruling, and after turning down several similar asylum claims, the refugee board had consistently held that the United States is a democracy, which affords deserters due judicial process. However, the Federal Court said the board should hear evidence on whether deserters can rely on the American government to treat them fairly regardless of its status as a democracy.

On July 14, 2008, a Los Angeles Times editorial referred to the July 4 ruling from Canada's Federal Court with these words:

...we should take a second look at our procedures for dealing with soldiers who allege human rights violations -- before they become deserters…[If] we would prefer not to hear shameful allegations from our own deserters and be judged by our neighbors, we cannot lightly dismiss expressions of moral outrage...

The Canadian Broadcasting Corporation's July 4, 2008, coverage of the story said that there is now a possibility that he "could qualify as a refugee."

=== Second IRB hearing: June 3, 2009 ===
On June 3, 2009, Joshua Key had a new hearing in front of the IRB. Ken Atkinson, the immigration board member who heard Key's case, reserved his decision. Lawrence Hill was present at this hearing, while supporters held a vigil outside. He was represented by attorney Alyssa Manning.

==== Negative IRB decision: July 30, 2010 ====
On July 30, 2010, Ken Atkinson of the IRB made a decision which rejected granting refugee status to Key. Atkinson stated, "I find that the claimant is neither a . . . refugee nor a person in need of protection."

Atkinson went on to say, "I find that there is adequate state protection in the USA and the claimant has not taken all reasonable steps to pursue the available state protection." The IRB made this statement even after the Federal Court had previously instructed the IRB to hear evidence on whether deserters can rely on the American government to treat them fairly (see above).

The negative ruling meant the Canada Border Services Agency could deport Key. Key said in a telephone interview that he is hopeful the Federal Court of Appeal would agree to hear his case, allowing him to stay in Canada.

Three months later, on October 22, 2010, Wikileaks released documents on the Iraq War which dealt, in part, with civilian deaths. Key praised these leaked documents as supporting his refugee claim.

In 2016, Key was granted temporary permission to work and receive government health care while his case continues to be reviewed.

== See also ==
- List of Iraq War Resisters
- Canada and Iraq War Resisters
- Nuremberg Defense
- Jeremy Hinzman
