= The War Logs =

The War Logs may refer to:

- Iraq War documents leak
- Afghan War documents leak
