= Canada and the Iraq War =

The Iraq War began with the US-led 2003 invasion of Iraq. The Government of Canada did not at any time formally declare war against Iraq, and the level and nature of this participation, which changed over time, was controversial. Canada's intelligence services repeatedly assessed that Iraq did not have an active weapon of mass destruction program.

While Canada had previously participated in military action against Iraq in the Gulf War of 1991, it refused to declare war against Iraq without United Nations Security Council (UNSC) approval. Even so, Prime Minister Jean Chrétien said on 10 October 2002 that Canada would be part of a military coalition to invade Iraq if it were sanctioned by the United Nations. However, when the United States and the United Kingdom subsequently withdrew their diplomatic efforts to gain that UN sanction, Chrétien announced in Parliament on 17 March 2003 that Canada would not participate in the pending invasion. Nevertheless, he offered the US and its soldiers his moral support. Two days earlier, a quarter million people in Montreal had marched against the pending war. Major anti-war demonstrations had taken place in several other Canadian cities.

Canada's relation to the Iraq War that began in 2003 was unlike Canada's role in the 2001 invasion of Afghanistan because it was far less direct. About a hundred Canadian exchange officers, on exchange to American units, participated in the invasion of Iraq. It has been reported that Canadian troops in the region numbered fewer than only three other participating countries. The War also affected Canada in the form of protests and counter-protests related to the conflict, and United States military members who sought refuge in the country after deserting their posts to avoid deployment to Iraq—but who, unlike as with the Vietnam War, were mostly returned by Canada forthwith to the United States.

== Decision not to participate ==
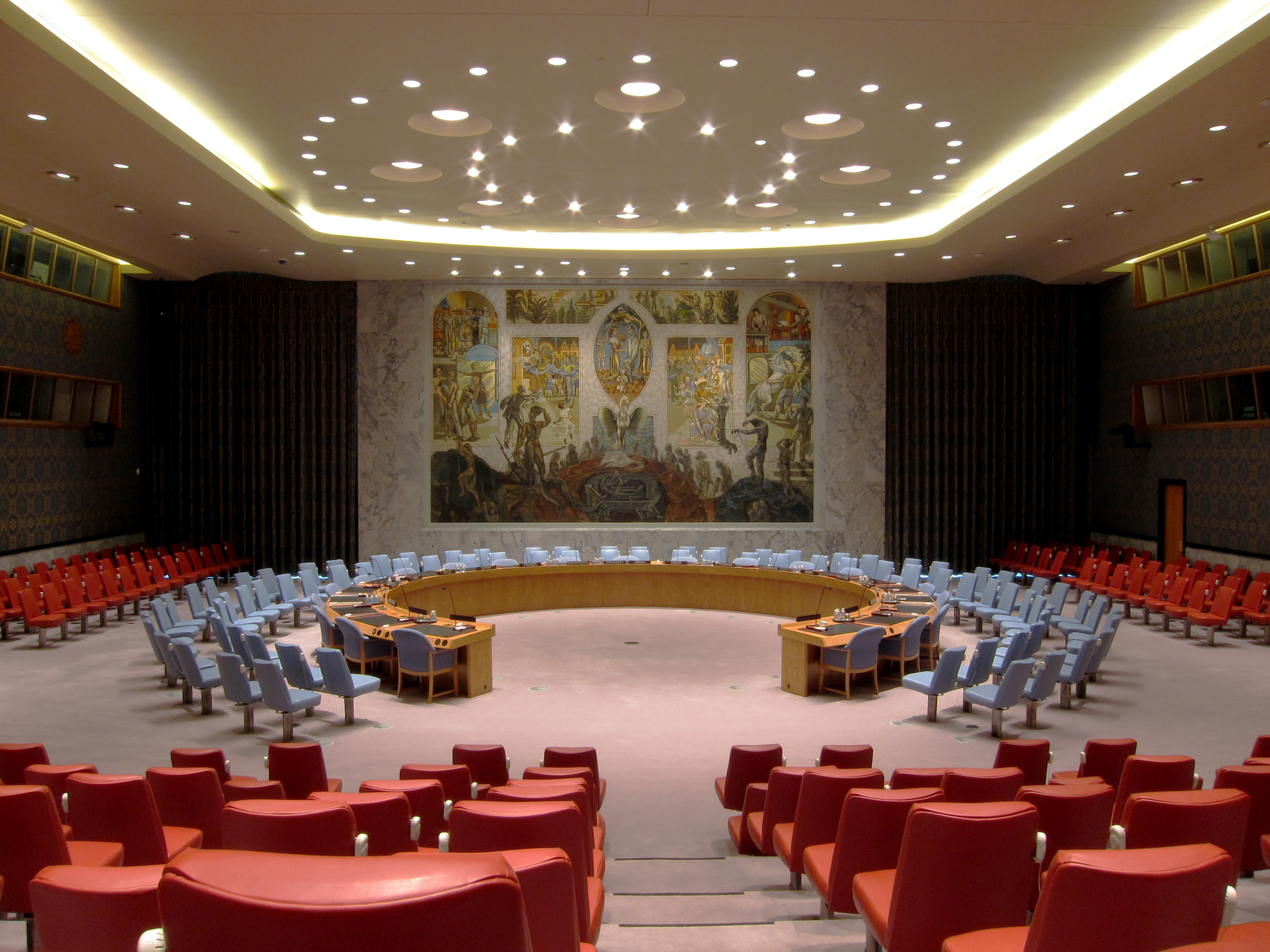
The chambers of the United Nations Security Council. In the months leading to the conflict, Canada made clear its support for military intervention against Iraq hinged on UN approval.

In September 2002, Chrétien informed both British Prime Minister Tony Blair and U.S. President George W. Bush that Canada's participation in any coalition against Iraq would be contingent on having the support of the United Nations (UN), or the majority of the international community. The official policy of the Canadian government was carefully worded so that the Canadian diplomats could still play an important factor in pre-war diplomacy with Iraq. Additionally, while it was their preference to have the approval of the United Nations Security Council, the policy still permitted the Canadian government to participate in the invasion if China or Russia vetoed a resolution that was supported by the rest of the UNSC. The Canadian government maintained this position in the lead-up to the invasion of Iraq.

During the lead-up to the conflict, Chrétien maintained contact with Ricardo Lagos, the President of Chile, and Vicente Fox, the President of Mexico. Lagos and Fox had noted they were under pressure from the United States to join the coalition, although both told Chrétien that they would refuse to participate if Canada does so as well.

The UN decision on whether or not to sanction the invasion rested on two elements: a discussion of international law, including the Nuremberg Principles on preemptive war; and the UN inspections for Iraq's alleged possession of weapons of mass destruction (WMD). However, because the coalition failed to have the UN sanction their intervention, Chrétien advised Governor General Adrienne Clarkson not to have Canada join the "coalition of the willing" that was planning to invade Iraq. On 17 March 2003, two days before the invasion began, Chrétien publicly announced his decision to not join the coalition on the floor of the Canadian House of Commons. He did not privately inform the US government of his decision before publicly announcing it in the House of Commons, which contributed to a breakdown in Chrétien's relationship with U.S. President Bush in mid-2003.

=== Domestic opinion ===
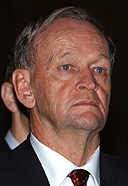
Jean Chrétien in 2003, the prime minister of Canada during the lead-up to the Iraq War

By August 2002, Canadian officials held no doubts that the United States was planning on targeting Iraq. On 14 August 2002, Chrétien received a memorandum from Alex Himelfarb, the Clerk of the Canadian Privy Council, in which Himelfarb bluntly stated that US actions against Iraq were an attempt to implement regime change. The majority of the members of the Cabinet of Canada had little general knowledge of Iraq, although most were sceptical of the American cause. However, some cabinet members held concerns that not joining the coalition would damage Canada-US relations because American rhetoric had linked Iraq to the vital interests of the United States.

However, during the lead-up to the war, Chrétien did not take account of the opinions of all Cabinet ministers in deciding whether to join the coalition, instead only consulting with key Cabinet members, including Minister of National Defence John McCallum and Minister of Foreign Affairs Bill Graham. During this period, he also consulted key diplomats, including Canadian Ambassador to the United States Michael Kergin and Canadian Ambassador to the UN Paul Heinbecker. In particular, in the months leading up to the war, Heinbecker and Chrétien maintained contact in an attempt to find a resolution that satisfied the American positions and the anti-war position held by France, although Heinbecker had little belief that his efforts would succeed.

Chrétien also regularly updated himself with his parliamentary caucus, whose near-unanimous opposition to the war without UN support helped Chrétien make his final decision. Opposition within the parliamentary caucus largely stemmed from members having to respond to constituents who collected petitions critical of going to war. This may have reflected the view of the general Canadian public, as reflected through a poll conducted in March 2003 by EKOS Research Associates for the Toronto Star; and by the Montreal newspaper La Presse, whose results found 71 per cent of those questioned did not support the United States-led invasion, with 27 per cent expressing disapproval. However, the Leader of the Official Opposition, Stephen Harper, objected to the Prime Minister's position on Iraq, stating that Canada should be fighting alongside the US. However, the prime minister's decision-making was largely uninfluenced by public opinion, with anti-war demonstrations in 2003 only confirming the position he held with the Americans in 2002.

==== Protests ====
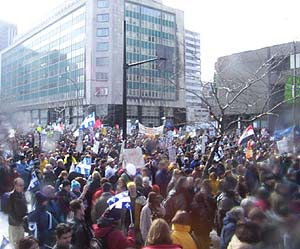
Demonstrations against the Iraq War in Montreal, 15 March 2003.

Protests against the Iraq War and counter-protests supporting the conflict took place in Canada both before and after the invasion of Iraq. One of the first large-scale demonstrations in opposition to the war took place at Queen's Park, Toronto, where approximately 2,000 people gathered on 16 November 2002. The following day, as part of a cross-country day of action, a 3,000-strong anti-war coalition held a peace march from Peace Flame Park in Vancouver, approximately 1,000 people marched in Montreal, and about 500 individuals gathered in a snowstorm on Parliament Hill in Ottawa, while other rallies took place in Edmonton, Winnipeg, and Halifax.

Canadians also took part in a set of protests that took place in towns and cities around the world in February 2003, the biggest in Canada being the gathering of 100,000 to 250,000 people in Montreal despite a wind chill of −30 °C (−22 °F). A further 10,000 to 100,000 people (sources varied widely) joined the demonstration in Toronto, 20,000 in Vancouver, 18,000 in Edmonton, 8,000 in Victoria, 4,000 in Halifax, and 2,000 in Ottawa; altogether, protests were held in close to 60 communities across the country.

=== Assessments from Canadian diplomats and intelligence ===
Assessments from Canadian diplomats, as well as the Canadian intelligence community, played a constructive role in shaping Chrétien's view on US policy towards Iraq, as well as claims that Iraq possessed WMDs. During the lead-up to the conflict, Canadian intelligence reports were primarily relayed to Chrétien through verbal briefings from Claude Laverdure, the prime minister's foreign and defence policy advisor. In addition to the prime minister, reports from the Canadian intelligence community were also distributed to cabinet members, senior Canadian officials, and officers within the Department of Foreign Affairs and International Trade. However, intelligence reports had varying degrees of effectiveness for those who received them; with Eddie Goldenberg, the prime minister's chief of staff later remarking that none of the intelligence assessments played a factor in the advice he gave to the prime minister.

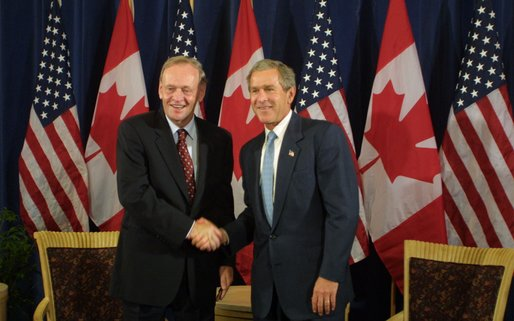
Chrétien shakes hands with Bush during a meeting in September 2002. In the same year, Bush offered to provide intelligence experts to brief him on Iraq, although this was declined.

In the autumn of 2002, Bush had offered to send intelligence experts to brief the prime minister, and later offered to come personally to brief him; although Chrétien instead choose to have said information pass through regular intelligence-sharing channels where Canadian analysts analyzed the information and passed it on to him. Reliance on Canadian analysis may have helped Chrétien reach a different conclusion from his American and British counterparts; with Blair at one point expressing frustration on how the Canadian prime minister failed to "see the evidence," despite the fact they largely shared the same intelligence sources. The Canadian intelligence assessment of Iraq in 2002 and 2003 was notable in that it deviated from the assessments provided by its Five Eyes partners, even though they all had access to the same information. This has largely been attributed to the fact that the Canadian intelligence community saw no external political pressures placed on it. Subsequent inquiries after the 2003 invasion into American intelligence on Iraq also found that American analysts had assumed Iraq was determined to restart its WMD program as soon as possible. This contrasted the assumptions held by Canadian analysts, who believed Iraq would temporarily suspend its WMD program for immediate economic relief; providing Canadian analysts the possibility to entertain the idea that Iraq may not have WMDs to begin with.

==== On Iraq ====
In the decade following the Gulf War, Iraq had been a high priority within the Canadian intelligence community. During the mid-1990s, Canadian intelligence analysts compiled several reports on UN inspections in Iraq, Iraqi internal developments, as well as deception efforts by the Iraqi government. However, the frequency of intelligence reports on Iraq dropped after the 1998 bombing of Iraq.

In early 2002, the International Assessments Staff (IAS), the intelligence assessment branch for the Canadian Privy Council Office and the foreign affairs department, held oral briefings with Canadian officials where they stressed that there was no credible evidence linking Iraq to the September 11th attacks; in response to claims made by the Bush administration. IAS analysts worked closely with members of the Canadian Security Intelligence Service (CSIS) who also shared the same view. In June 2002, the Intelligence Assessment Committee (IAC), a committee that coordinated the analytical units of CSIS, IAS, and the Department of National Defence's (DND) Director General Intelligence, had also concluded that there was little evidence that regimes like Iraq were providing chemical weapons to terrorist organizations.

On 30 August 2002, the IAC published another assessment to determine whether or not Iraq had any WMD stockpiles, and whether or not the country was attempting to reconstitute its WMD program after the 1998 bombings. In its assessment, it could not conclude with certainty that Iraq had destroyed its WMDs, although it did note that any chemical agents or ballistic missiles that Iraq may possess would be in very small quantities, and would most likely be out of service due to poor storage of the materials. The assessment also could find no real indications that Iraq was reconstituting a nuclear program. The IAC assessment was also sceptical of the evidence presented by the Americans and was specifically critical of how there was little evidence of the wide range of equipment and resources needed to start such a program; even when accounting for potential deception efforts by the Iraqis. The Interdepartmental Experts Groups, a group that supported the work of the IAC, also found no evidence of that the Iraqi chemical weapons program was reconstituted; although did make note that Iraqi ballistic missiles may have exceeded the 150-kilometre-range (93 mi), although only by a limited amount. The IAS also assessed that Iraq did not appear to have taken the technical steps required to weaponize a biological agent like smallpox, although DND analysts have also highlighted that Iraq may have the virus itself. However, scientific analysis from the DND largely corroborated with the IAC's assessment. The DND reported with high confidence, although not with absolute certainty, that Iraq no longer possessed chemical agents or munitions dating to the Gulf War. The DND also could not find credible evidence that the Iraqi nuclear program had been restarted. In March 2003, in the weeks before the invasion of Iraq, the DND published a report called Iraq: No Smoke, No Gun, where it assessed the coalition forces would fail to find WMDs in Iraq. Given that it contradicted the intelligence assessment from the UK and US, as well as the claims made by the coalition, the report was not shared with Canada's allies to not endanger the country's relationship with its Five Eyes partners. IAS reports that also disagreed with the intelligence assessments of its Five Eyes partners were also marked as "Canadian-Eyes Only".

From late August 2002, the IAC focused its efforts on reviewing incoming intelligence reports that would alter its assessment. However, the conclusion reached by the IAC was reinforced by Canadian defence intelligence analysts who maintained regular contact with their counterparts in the UK, and to a lesser extent, in the US; where on a one-on-one basis, allied analyst seemingly expressed reservations about the evidence being shared through the Five Eyes intelligence-sharing arrangement.

The IAS had also received intelligence passed along from the informant referred to as Curveball; concluding that the information provided by the informant was only circumstantial, and provided no direct evidence that Iraq had an active WMD program, or that they had the necessary delivery capabilities. In early 2003, the US provided Canada with the classified version of a National Intelligence Estimate for Iraqi WMDs. Issues within the National Intelligence Estimate, including dissenting views taken from various US departments within the classified version of the document further reinforced IAS's assessment that Iraq didn't have WMDs.

However, CSIS may have provided the impression to the Americans that the Canadian intelligence community had suspicions that Iraq possessed WMDs in early 2002, owing to a report from the organization which raised such concerns in February 2002. Although that report was later withdrawn after the IAS raised several concerns about it, it had already been forwarded to the US.

==== On the United States ====
The Canadian intelligence community's assessment of the situation was also influenced by their intelligence of the United States. Shortly after the September 11 attacks in 2001, Kergin, returned to Ottawa to brief government officials on the ramifications of the events within the American administration; with Kergin noting that the Americans had adopted a "Manichean worldview," and warned Canadian officials to prepare for a United States that viewed global affairs in only a black and white lens. Heinbecker's belief that the US security strategy had moved towards emphasizing unilateral military commitments also reinforced Chrétien's suspicions of American claims against Iraq.

Shortly after the invasion of Afghanistan began, Canadian officials noticed an uptick in American intelligence reports that paid close attention to Iraq. After it became evident that the US administration was targeting Iraq, the IAS produced an assessment in February 2002 on the likely policy direction the Americans would pursue with Iraq; having assessed that there was a high probability the US would ultimately invade Iraq. In April, the IAS built upon this assessment, evaluating how the US administration would justify an invasion. In the assessment, they concluded that the US would most likely attempt to link Iraq to the September 11th attacks or al-Qaida, as it provides grounds for self-defence; although it also noted that if that failed, they would seek to justify military actions because Iraq had continued to develop WMDs. Within the following months, the IAS produced several assessments on how the US would conduct a military campaign in Iraq. By mid-2002, as the US administration failed to convince the public of Iraqi links to the September 11th attacks, it had become obvious to IAS analysts that the second option would be pursued by the US, justifying an intervention because Iraq's WMD program was active.

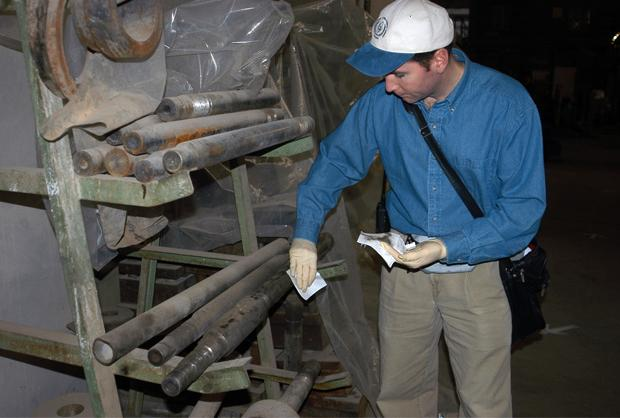
A UN weapons inspector in Iraq in December 2002

In the months before the war, Canadian intelligence liaisons in Washington had noted that the Central Intelligence Agency was under political pressure to find evidence that confirmed the existence of a WMD program in Iraq. Canadian analysts were also critical of how the US intelligence community were dismissive of the information being collected by UN inspector in Iraq, with the Americans viewing the UN inspectors as disorganized and ineffective.

=== Military constraints ===
It was also noted that the Prime Minister's advice to the viceroy was also based on feasibility problems for Canada, with Maclean's magazine reporting that "Canada has committed about 2,000 troops to Afghanistan this summer, a significant contribution given the stretched state of the Canadian military."

Neither the Pentagon nor the office of the US secretary of defence had pressured Canada for military support; with US defence secretary Donald Rumsfeld making it clear to McCallum that the Americans were not seeking military support from Canada, and preferred if the Canadian Armed Forces focused on their deployment in Afghanistan. Pressure for Canada to participate in the coalition primarily originated from the White House, which "sought the Canadian flag and the political cover it granted an invasion."

== Canadian involvement ==
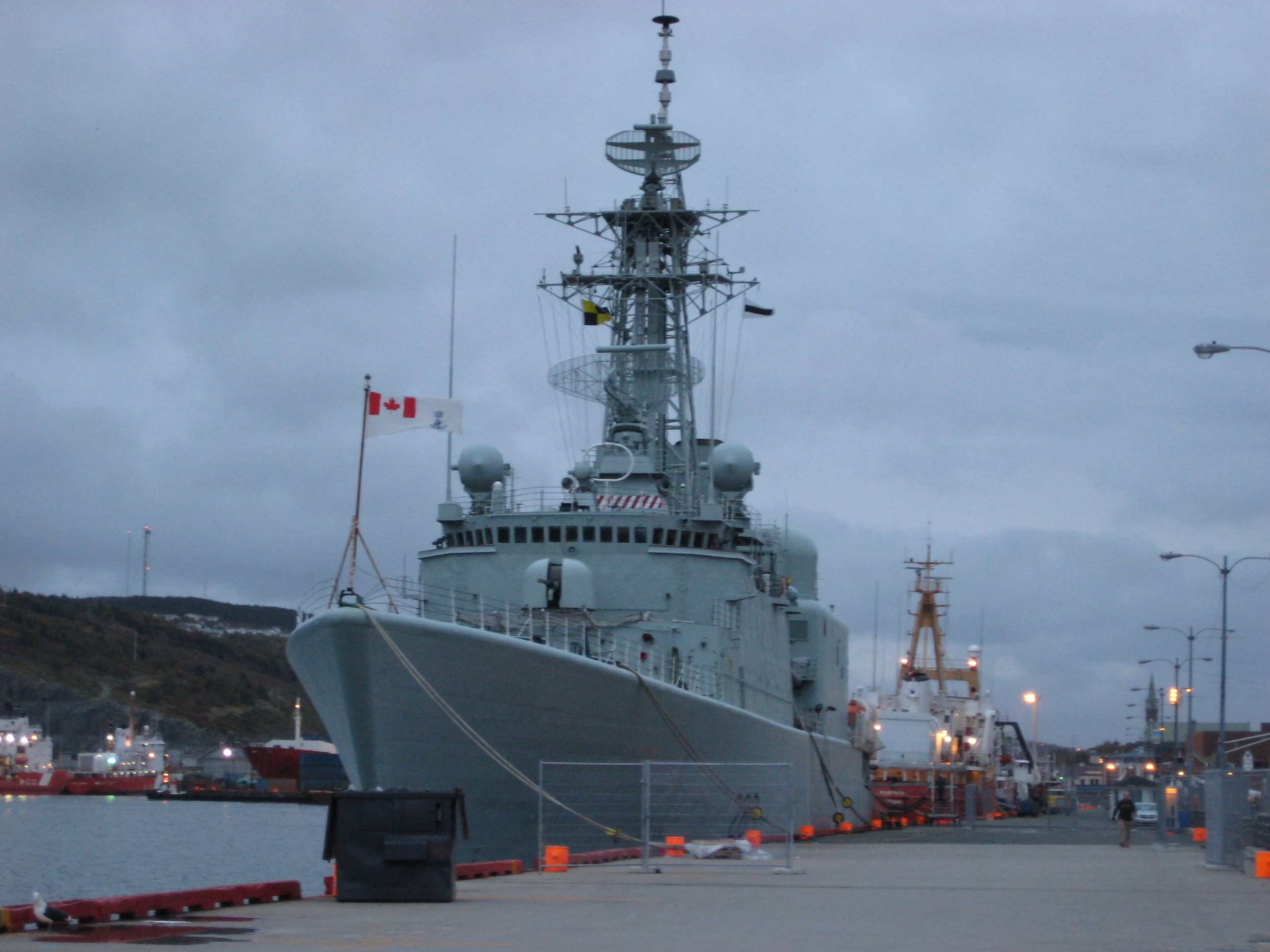
HMCS Iroquois, one of four Canadian ships deployed to the Persian Gulf in relation to the Iraq War

Canada, despite not joining the invading coalition, still participated in the conflict in Iraq, joining a number of non-belligerent nations in helping to rebuild the country post-invasion, including the training of Iraqi police and army officers, and contributing approximately $300 million towards this effort. Also, a group of Canadians, including former Ontario Premier Bob Rae, were sent in the summer of 2005 to help compose the new Iraqi constitution, and Jean-Pierre Kingsley served as head of the international team observing the Iraqi legislative election of January 2005. Due to security concerns, both of these groups were based in Jordan.

=== Military participation ===
Though no declaration of war was issued, the Governor General-in-Council did order the mobilization of a number of Canadian Forces personnel to serve actively in Iraq. On 31 March 2003, it was reported in Maclean's that in the previous month Canadian officers, aboard three frigates and a destroyer, had been placed in command of the multinational naval group Task Force 151, which patrolled the Persian Gulf region. A further 30 Canadians worked at the US Central Command in Qatar, and 150 troops were on exchange with US and British forces in proximity to combat. North American Aerospace Defense Command (NORAD) stationed Canadian Air Force pilots also flew combat missions with the US Air Force E-3 Sentry, and exchange officers fought with US units. Canadian pilots also flew Boeing C-17s into Iraq to "season" the flight crews. In all, 40 to 50 Canadian military members participated in the conflict.

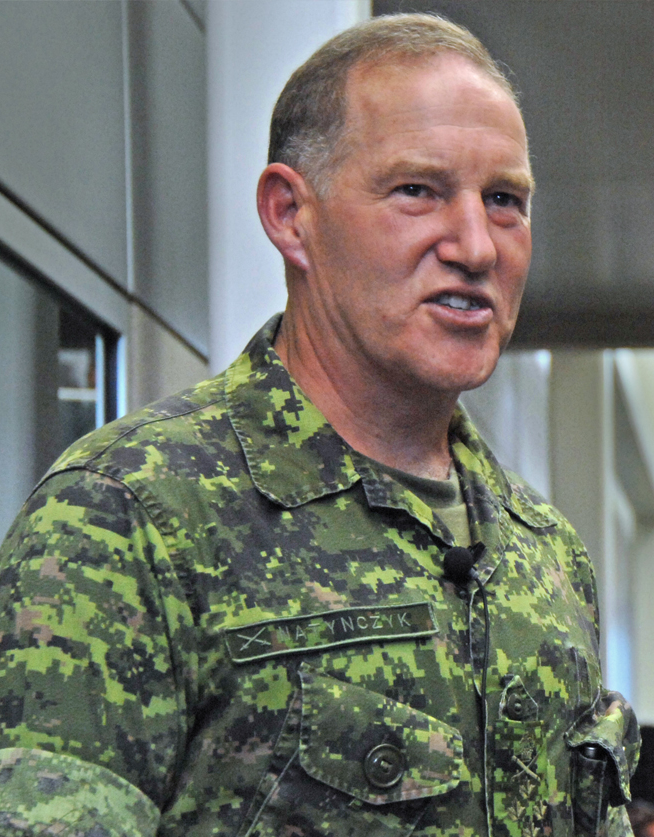
General Walter Natynczyk, one of the Canadian officers who served in Iraq, then a brigadier-general

Because of this Canadian involvement in Iraq, the Ministers of the Crown at the time were criticised by Her Majesty's Loyal Opposition as hypocritical, and demands were made for the return of these Canadian Forces personnel. The Prime Minister stated that the Canadian military was not involved in direct combat, while still fulfilling its commitment to NORAD. However, it was claimed by Janice Gross Stein and Eugene Lang in The Unexpected War that people from Canadian ministries were in Washington, D.C., openly vaunting Canada's participation in Iraq; as Stein and Lang put it: "in an almost schizophrenic way, the government bragged publicly about its decision to stand aside from the war in Iraq because it violated core principles of multilateralism and support for the United Nations. At the same time, senior Canadian officials, military officers and politicians were currying favour in Washington, privately telling anyone in the State Department of the Pentagon who would listen that, by some measures, Canada's indirect contribution to the American war effort in Iraq– three ships and 100 exchange officers– exceeded that of all but three other countries that were formally part of the coalition."

Amongst the Canadian officers who were sent to Iraq were: Brigadier-General Walter Natynczyk, who was later appointed Chief of the Defence Staff; Major-General Peter Devlin, who served since 14 December 2006 as Multi-National Corps-Iraq Deputy Command General as part of his role as Deputy Commander of the US III Corps through an officer exchange program; and General Nicolas Matern, a special forces officer and former commander of Canada's elite counter-terrorism unit, who in mid February 2008 began service as deputy to Lieutenant-General Lloyd Austin.

=== Canadians taken hostage ===
Eight Canadians were taken hostage in Iraq over the course of the conflict there; one, Zaid Meerwali, an Iraqi-Canadian truck driver, was killed in 2005, and another Iraqi-Canadian, Rifat Mohammed Rifat, has been missing since 2004 and is presumed dead. The 2005 abduction of James Loney and Harmeet Singh Sooden, both members of the organization Christian Peacemaker Teams, garnered wide attention, as did their release the following year in a multi-national operation led by Task Force Black, involving British, American, and Canadian special forces, supported by Task Force Maroon, Joint Task Force 2, the Royal Canadian Mounted Police, and Canadian Security Intelligence Service. The remaining four Canadians taken hostage included: Fadi Ihsan Fadel, a Syrian-Canadian employed by the International Rescue Committee who was taken hostage in Najaf on 8 April 2004 and released eight days later; Naji al-Kuwaiti, was taken hostage on 28 April 2004 and released on 4 May of the same year; Fairuz Yamucky, who was abducted on 6 September 2004 and rescued by a United States National Guard unit sixteen days later; and Scott Taylor, a journalist abducted by Ansar al-Islam in Tal Afar on 9 September 2004 and held captive for five days.

== American war resisters ==
During the Iraq War there were United States military personnel who refused to participate, or continue to participate, in that specific war. Their refusal meant that they faced the possibility of punishment in the United States according to Article 85 of the US Uniform Code of Military Justice. For that reason some of them chose to go to Canada as a place of refuge.

The choice of these United States Iraq war resisters to go to Canada has led to considerable debate in Canada's society, press, legal arenas, and political arenas. On 3 June 2008 and 30 March 2009, two motions were passed in the Parliament of Canada in support of the war resisters' efforts to stay in Canada. An Angus Reid Strategies poll taken on 6 and 7 June 2008, showed that 64% of Canadians agreed with that motion. But the motions' recommendation was non-binding and was never implemented by the minority Conservative government. Then, on 17 September 2009, Gerard Kennedy introduced BILL C-440, a binding form of those motions, which in his words was "in response to the refusal of the Minister of Citizenship, Immigration and Multiculturalism, Jason Kenney, to show Canadian sensibility." It has yet to be passed.

== See also ==
- Opposition to the Iraq War

== Sources ==
- Barnes, Alan (28 May 2020). "Getting it right: Canadian intelligence assessments on Iraq, 2002-2003". Intelligence and National Security. 35 (7): 925–953. doi:10.1080/02684527.2020.1771934. ISSN 0268-4527.
- Sayle, Timothy A. (2015). ""But he has nothing on at all!" Canada and the Iraq War, 2003". Canadian Military History. 19 (4): 5–19.
