= Canada and the Vietnam War =

Canada did not officially participate in the Vietnam War. However, it contributed to peacekeeping forces in 1973 to help enforce the Paris Peace Accords.

Privately, some Canadians contributed to the war effort. Canadian corporations sold materiel to the U.S. government. In addition, at least 30,000 Canadians volunteered to serve in the U.S. armed forces during the war. At least 134 Canadians died or were reported missing in Vietnam.

Meanwhile, tens of thousands of U.S. Vietnam War resisters immigrated to Canada to avoid the draft. Largely middle class and educated, they had a significant impact on Canadian life. After the war, tens of thousands of Vietnamese boat people were also admitted and became a unique part of Canadian life.

== Beginnings ==
During the First Indochina War between France and the Indo-Chinese nationalist and communist parties, Canada remained militarily neutral but provided modest diplomatic and economic support to the French. Canada was, however, part of the International Control Commission (along with Poland and India) that oversaw the 1954 Geneva Agreements that divided Vietnam, provided for French withdrawal, and would have instituted elections for reunification by 1956. Behind the scenes, Canadian diplomats tried to discourage both France and the United States from escalating the conflict in a part of the world Canada had decided was not strategically vital.

Canada laid out six prerequisites to joining a war effort or Asian alliance like SEATO:

1. It had to involve cultural and trade connections in addition to a military alliance.
2. It had to demonstrably meet the will of the people in the countries involved.
3. Other free Asian states had to support it directly or in principle.
4. France had to refer the conflict to the United Nations organization.
5. Any multilateral action must conform to the UN charter.
6. Any action had to be divorced from all elements of colonialism.

These criteria effectively guaranteed Canada would not participate in the Vietnam War.

== Canadian involvement in the war ==
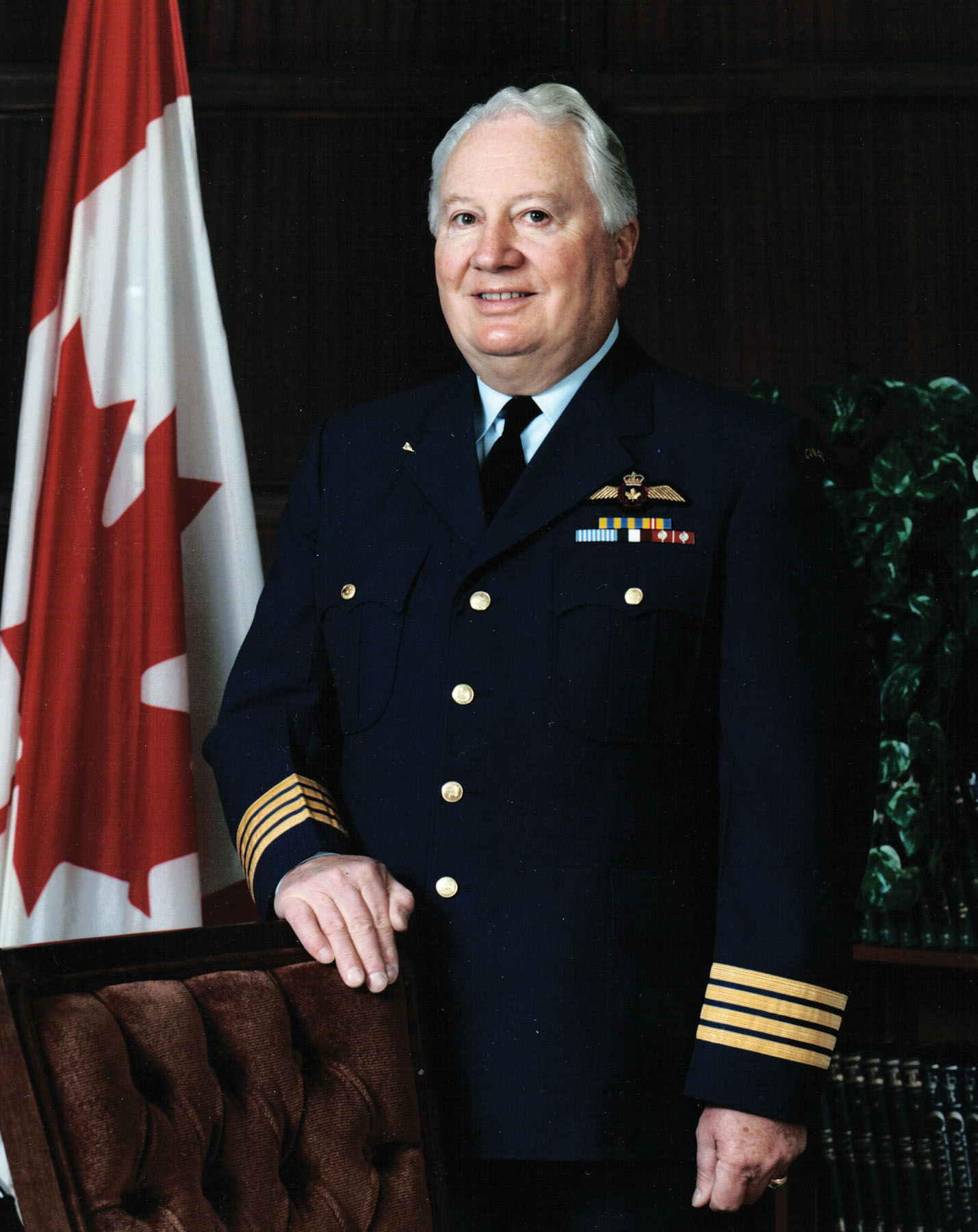
Colonel Lorne RodenBush was Canada's representative to the International Control Commission in Vietnam from 1967– 68.

At the start of the Vietnam War, Canada was a member of the International Control Commission (ICC) overseeing the implementation of the Geneva Agreements, and thus attempted to maintain an air of neutrality. However, the Canadian negotiators were strongly on the side of the U.S. One representative (J. Blair Seaborn, younger brother of Robert Seaborn) was even involved in secretly exchanging messages between the U.S. and North Vietnam on behalf of the U.S., with the approval of the Canadian government. Canada also sent foreign aid to South Vietnam, which, while humanitarian, was directed by the U.S. Canada tried to mediate between the warring countries, aiming for a conclusion that could allow the U.S. to leave the conflict honourably. It has also been commonly believed, as reported at the time, that the Canadian government of Prime Minister Lester Pearson publicly criticized U.S. war methods. Yet, the text of a speech which Pearson delivered at Temple University in Philadelphia on April 2, 1965, has debunked this widespread rumor, with Pearson even stating "The government and great majority of people of my country have supported wholeheartedly the US peacekeeping and peacemaking policies in Vietnam."

Meanwhile, Canadian industry exported military supplies and raw materials useful in their manufacture, including ammunition, napalm and Agent Orange, to the United States, as trade between the two countries continued without interruption or hindrance. In total, Canadians firms sold over $12.5 billion of war materials to the US during the war, including machinery, munitions, clothing, food, and raw materials. Testing of Agent Orange also took place in Canada.

"500 firms sold $2.5 billion of war materials (ammunition, napalm, aircraft engines and explosives) to the Pentagon. Another $10 billion in food, beverages, berets and boots for the troops was exported to the U.S., as well as nickel, copper, lead, oil, brass for shell casings, wiring, plate armour and military transport. In Canada unemployment fell to record low levels of 3.9%".

Although these exports were sales by Canadian firms, not gifts from the Canadian government, they nonetheless benefited the U.S. war effort. The first official statement about the Canadian economic support given to the United States armed forces was by Lester Pearson on March 10, 1967, when he stated that the export of goods to Canada's southern ally was "necessary and logical" due to the extreme integration of both economies, and that an embargo would be a notice of withdrawal from North American defense arrangements.

As the war escalated, however, relations between Canada and the United States gradually deteriorated. In his Temple University speech, while stating firm support for U.S. policy, Pearson also called for a pause in the bombing of North Vietnam. In a perhaps apocryphal story, when a furious President Lyndon B. Johnson met with Pearson the next day, he grabbed the much smaller Canadian by his lapels and talked angrily with him for an hour. After this incident, the two men somehow found ways to resolve their differences over the war and had further contacts, including later twice meeting in Canada. With the federal elections of 1968, which brought Pierre Trudeau to the prime ministry, Canadian policy changed radically to one of unrelenting criticism of U.S. policy in Vietnam. Trudeau called for immediate negotiations between the U.S. and North Vietnam and offered on at least one occasion to serve as mediator in the negotiations, annoying President Richard Nixon, who succeeded Lyndon Johnson after his own election to the U.S. presidency in 1968.

== Assistance to the U.S. war effort ==
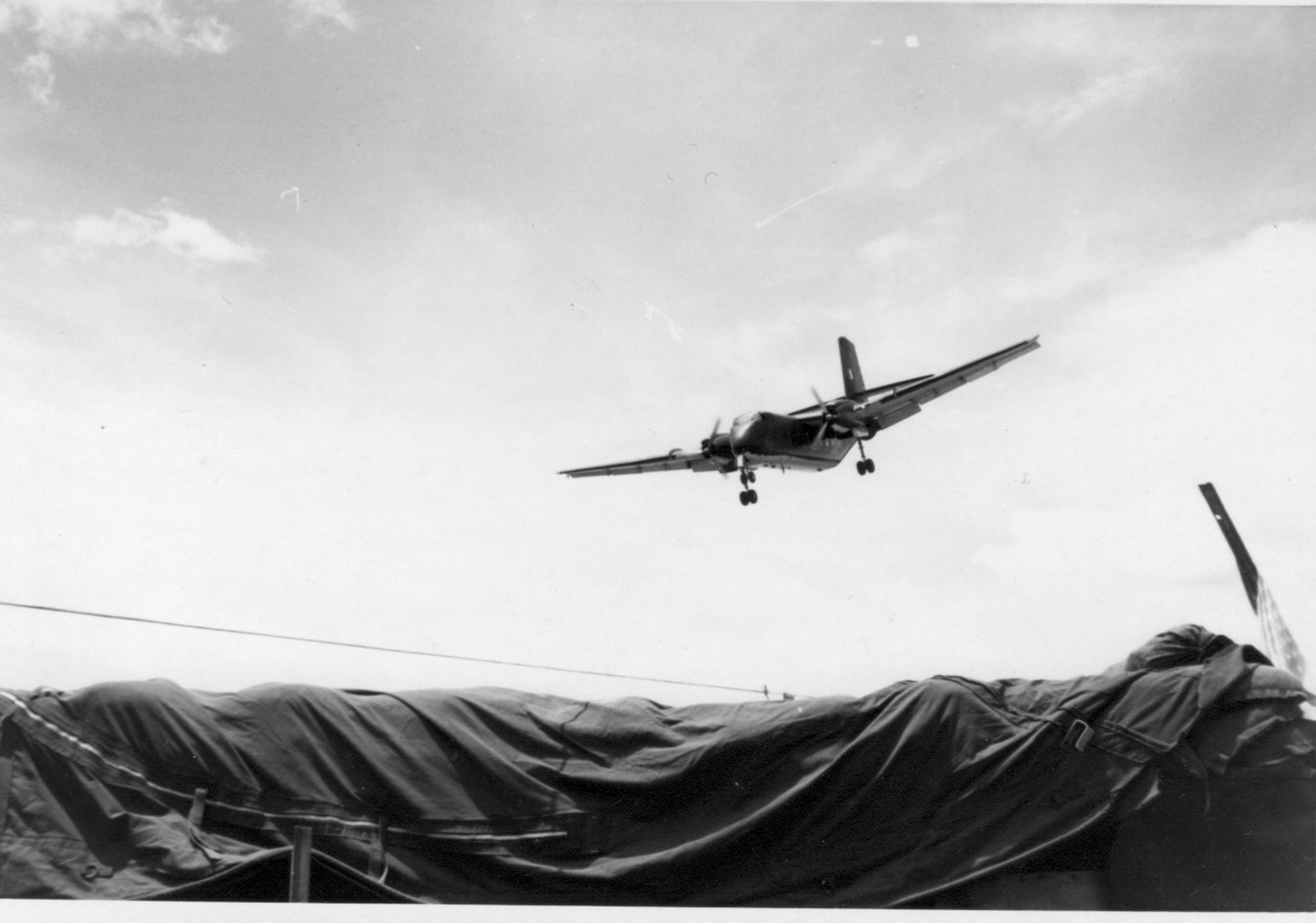
A de Havilland Canada DHC-4 Caribou transport plane on landing approach, Vietnam War, 1971

Canada's official diplomatic position in relation to the Vietnam War was that of a non-belligerent, which imposed a ban on the export of war-related items to the combat areas. Nonetheless, Canadian industry was also a major supplier of equipment and supplies to the U.S. forces, not sending these directly to South Vietnam but to the United States. The goods included relatively benign items like boots, but also aircraft, munitions, napalm, and commercial defoliants, the use of which was fiercely opposed by anti-war protesters at the time. In accordance with the 1956 Defence Production Sharing Agreement, Canadian industry sold $2.47 billion in materiel to the United States between 1965 and 1973. Many of the companies were owned by US parent firms, but all export sales over $100,000 US (and thus, the majority of contracts) were arranged through the Canadian Commercial Corporation, a crown corporation which functioned as an intermediary between the United States Department of Defense and Canadian industry. In some cases Canadian defence contractors were even sent to the theatre of war to undertake company work, such as when de Havilland Canada sent mobile repair teams from the Downsview, Toronto plant to complete depot-level repair of battle-damaged de Havilland Caribou aircraft that were owned and operated by the U.S. Army. Furthermore, the Canadian and the American Defence departments worked together to test chemical defoliants for use in Vietnam, a collaboration only revealed to the public in 1981. Canada also allowed their NATO ally to use Canadian facilities and bases for training exercises and weapons testing as per existing treaties.

Canadian diplomats covertly supported US counterinsurgency and espionage efforts in Vietnam, justifying these actions as a counterbalance to similar activities conducted by its Eastern bloc peers on the International Control Commission and the International Commission of Control and Supervision.

Between January 28, 1973, and July 31, 1973, Canada provided 240 peacekeeping troops to Operation Gallant, the peacekeeping operation associated with the International Commission of Control and Supervision (ICCS) Vietnam, along with Hungary, Indonesia, and Poland. Their role was to monitor the cease-fire in South Vietnam per the Paris Peace Accords. After Canada's departure from the commission, it was replaced by Iran.

== Canadians in the U.S. armed forces ==
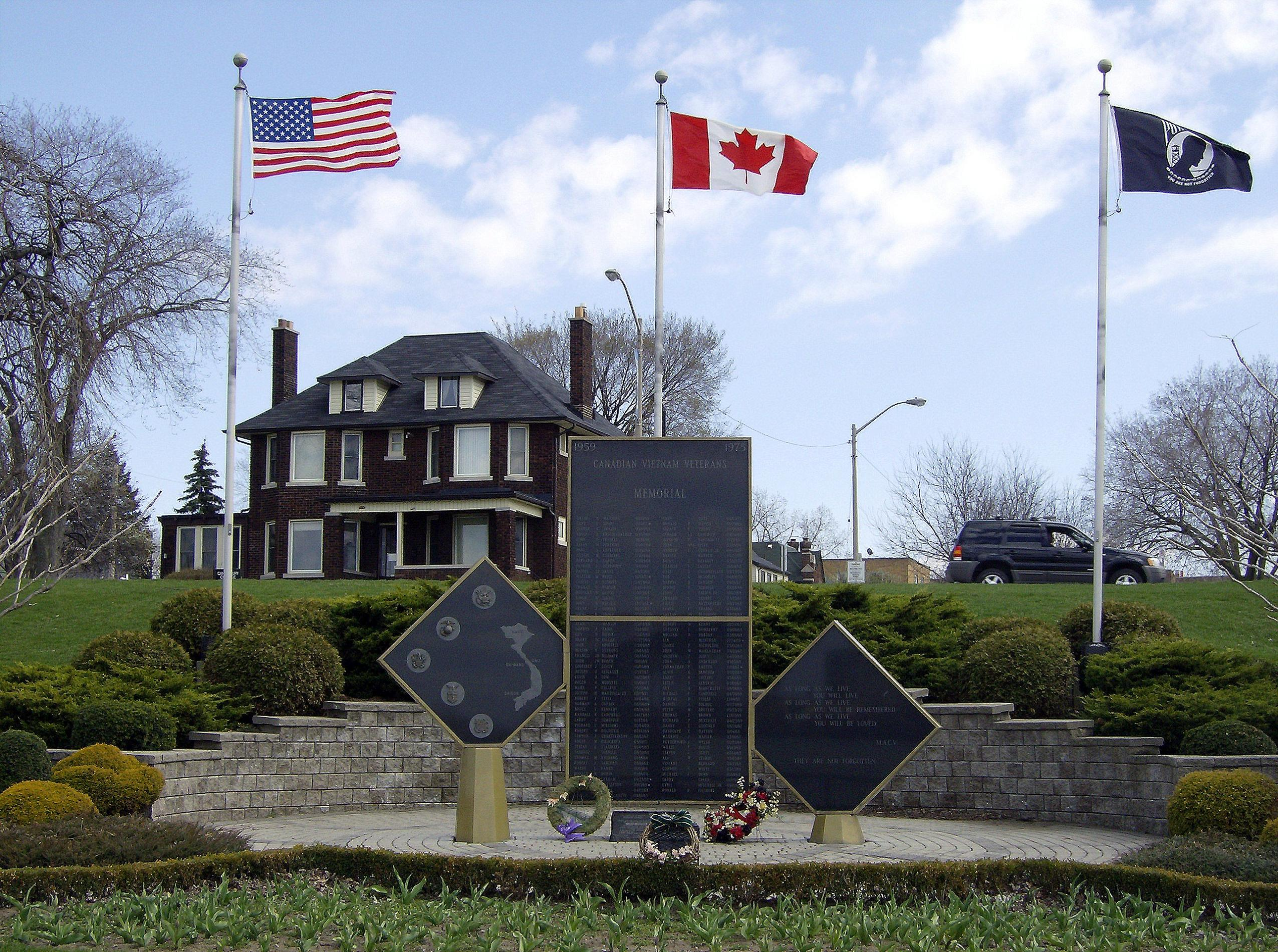
The Canadian Vietnam Veterans Memorial in Windsor, Ontario, commemorates Canadians who died fighting alongside American forces in Vietnam.

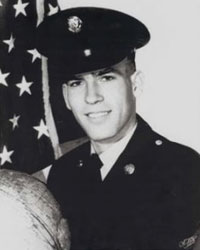
Toronto-born Peter C. Lemon served with distinction in the U.S. Army in Vietnam.

In a counter-current to the movement of U.S. draft evaders and deserters to Canada, about 30,000 Canadians volunteered to fight for the U.S. in Southeast Asia. Among the volunteers were 50 Mohawks from the Kahnawake reserve near Montreal. U.S. Army Sergeant Peter C. Lemon, an immigrant from Canada, was awarded the U.S. Medal of Honor for his valour in the conflict. This cross-border enlistment was not unprecedented: Both the First and the Second World War saw thousands of Americans join the Canadian military before the U.S. officially declared war on Germany.

In 2015, the Canadian Broadcasting Corporation (CBC) produced a story remembering the Canadians who fought and died in the war. According to that story, a Canadian veterans association estimates that 20,000 Canadians enlisted in the U.S. armed forces to fight alongside the Americans, while some historians put the number as high as 40,000. Of these, an estimated 12,000 saw combat in Vietnam, and at least 134 were killed or declared missing in action.

The 2015 CBC story paid special attention to Rob McSorley, a teen-age Army Ranger from Vancouver who was shot dead by North Vietnamese soldiers. Other Canadians who gave their lives and were recognized in the story include:

- Thomas Edwin Fraser of the Six Nations Reserve in Ohsweken, Ontario
- Randolph Hatton from Toronto
- Robert Wilson Holditch from Port Robinson, Ontario
- Bruce Thomas Kennedy from Espanola, Ontario
- Jonathan Peter Kmetyk from St. Catharines, Ontario
- John J. Roden from Halifax, Nova Scotia
- Larry Semeniuk from Windsor, Ontario
- Murray Dean Vidler from Kerrobert, Saskatchewan.

In Windsor, Ontario, there is a privately funded monument to the Canadians killed in the Vietnam War. In Melocheville, Quebec, there is a monument dating from October 1989 funded by the Association Québécoise des Vétérans du Vietnam.

== U.S. war resisters in Canada ==
U.S. draft evaders (often referred to by the disparaging term "draft dodgers") and military deserters who sought refuge in Canada during the Vietnam War would ignite controversy among those seeking to immigrate to Canada, some of it provoked by the Canadian government's initial refusal to admit those who could not prove they had been discharged from U.S. military service. This changed in 1968 with the installment of Pierre Trudeau as prime minister. On May 22, 1969, Ottawa announced that Canadian immigration officials could not ask about immigration applicants' military status if they appeared at the border seeking permanent residence in Canada. According to Valerie Knowles, draft evaders were usually college-educated sons of the middle class who could no longer defer induction into the Selective Service System. Deserters, on the other hand, were predominantly sons of the lower-middle and working classes who had been inducted into the armed services directly from high school or who had volunteered, hoping to obtain a skill and broaden their opportunities.

Starting in 1965, Canada became a choice haven for U.S. draft evaders and deserters. Because they were not formally classified as refugees but admitted as immigrants, there is no official estimate of how many draft evaders and deserters entered Canada during the Vietnam War. One informed estimate puts their number between 30,000 and 40,000. Whether or not this estimate is accurate, the fact remains that emigration from the United States was high as long as the U.S. was participating in the war militarily and maintained compulsory military service. In 1971–72, Canada received more immigrants from the United States than from any other country.

=== Draft evaders ===
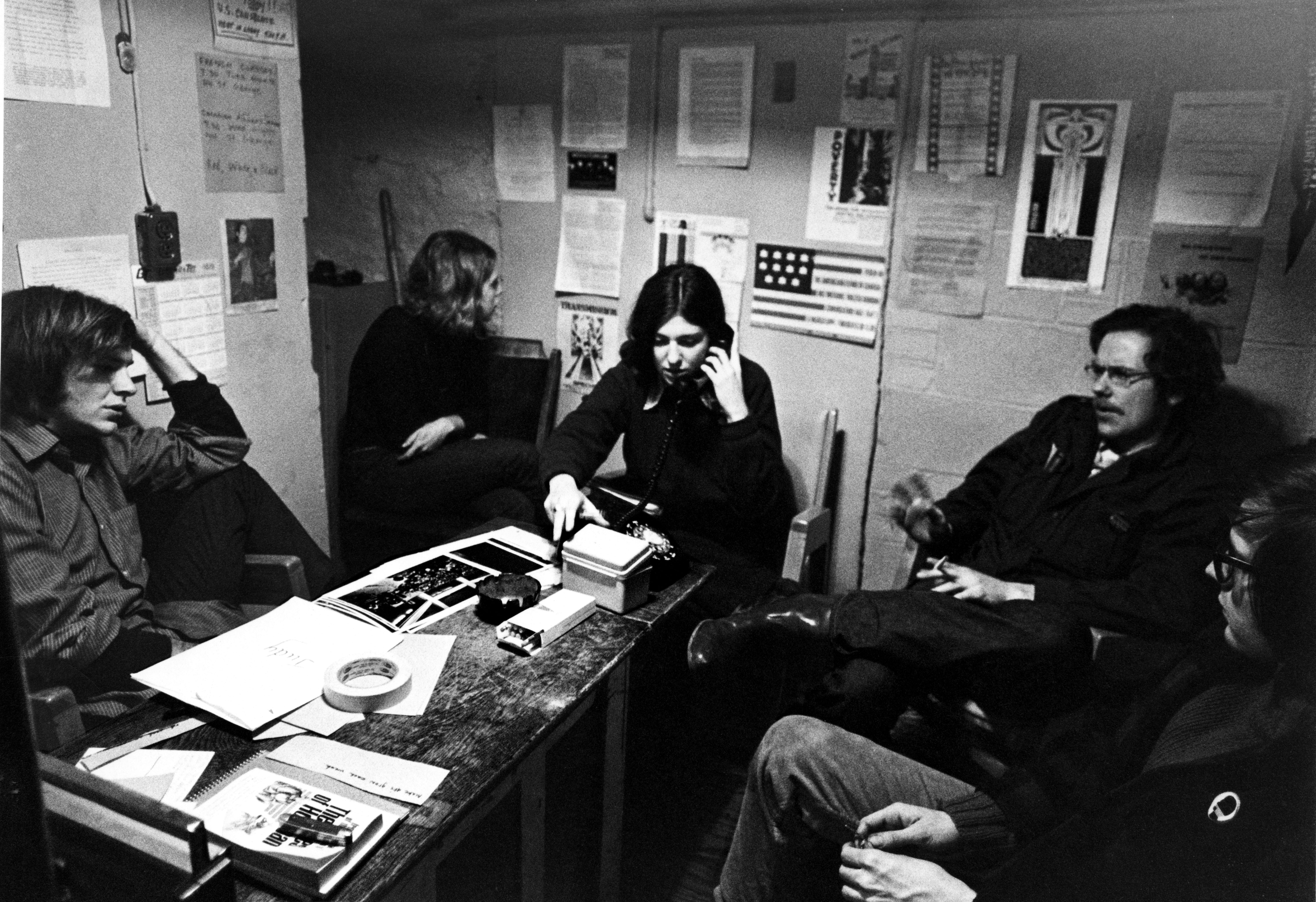
Mark Satin (left) counseling American Vietnam War evaders at the Anti-Draft Programme office in Toronto, 1967

Estimates vary greatly as to how many males from the U.S. settled in Canada for the specific reason of dodging the draft or "evading conscription," as opposed to desertion, or other reasons. Canadian immigration statistics show that 20,000 to 30,000 draft-eligible males from the U.S. came to Canada as immigrants during the Vietnam era. The BBC has reported that "as many as 60,000 young American men dodged the draft." Estimates of the total number of U.S. citizens who moved to Canada due to their opposition to the war range from 50,000 to 125,000 This exodus was "the largest politically motivated migration from the United States since the United Empire Loyalists moved north to oppose the American Revolution." Major communities of war resisters formed in Montreal, the Slocan Valley, British Columbia, and on Baldwin Street in Toronto, Ontario.

They were at first assisted by the Student Union for Peace Action, a campus-based Canadian anti-war organization with connections to Students for a Democratic Society in the U.S. Canadian immigration policy at the time made it easy for immigrants from all countries to obtain legal status in Canada. By late 1967, draft evaders were being assisted primarily by several locally based anti-draft organizations (over twenty of them), such as the Vancouver Committee to Aid American War Objectors and the Toronto Anti-Draft Programme. As a counselor for the Programme, Mark Satin wrote the Manual for Draft-Age Immigrants to Canada in 1968. It sold nearly 100,000 copies overall. In 1970, Canadian singer Gordon Lightfoot recorded his song "Sit Down Young Stranger" to express his views on Canada's acceptance of American draft evaders.

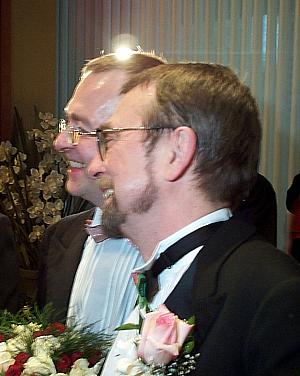
Quebec gay rights advocate Michael Hendricks (right) is one American war resister who affected Canadian life.

The influx of these young men, who, as mentioned earlier, were often well educated and politically leftist, affected Canada's academic and cultural institutions, and Canadian society at large. These new arrivals tended to balance the "brain drain" that Canada had experienced. While some draft evaders returned to the United States after a pardon was declared in 1977 during the presidential administration of Jimmy Carter, roughly half of them stayed in Canada.

Prominent draft evaders who stayed in Canada permanently, or for a significant amount of time, have included:

- Mike Fisher – founding member of Heart, notable rock/pop band
- William Gibson – science fiction writer, winner of a Nebula Award
- Jim Green – Vancouver city councillor and mayoral candidate
- Michael Hendricks – gay rights advocate
- Jeffry House – lawyer, clients include many activists
- Bill King – musician and organizer of Toronto's Beaches Jazz Festival
- Michael Klein – activist physician, spouse of Bonnie Sherr Klein, father of Naomi Klein
- Keith Maillard – professor of creative writing, University of British Columbia
- Eric Nagler – children's entertainer on The Elephant Show
- Wayne Robinson – father of Svend Robinson, former Member of Parliament
- Jay Scott – film critic, The Globe and Mail
- Jesse Winchester – singer-songwriter
- Michael Wolfson – assistant chief statistician at Statistics Canada
- Harry Yates – human resources manager at the Ministry of the Attorney General of British Columbia

=== Deserters ===
Interview with Mike Tulley, an American Vietnam War deserter who emigrated to Canada. (For interview, click on gray arrow at lower left of photo.)

Distinct from draft resisters, there were also deserters from the U.S. armed forces who also made their way to Canada. There was pressure from both the United States and Canada for the deserters to be arrested, or at least stopped at the border.

The deserters have not been pardoned and may still face pro forma arrest, as the case of Allen Abney demonstrated in March 2006. Another similar case was that of Richard Allen Shields, who had deserted the U.S. Army in Alaska in 1972 after serving a year in Vietnam. Twenty-eight years later, on March 22, 2000, while he attempted to drive a lumber truck across the US-Canada border (in Metaline Falls, Washington) he was arrested by U.S. Customs agents and jailed at Fort Sill. He was discharged from the Army with an Other Than Honorable discharge in April 2000. Other noteworthy deserters from that era include the following:

- Andy Barrie – former host of Canadian Broadcasting Corporation Radio's Metro Morning in Toronto (He later received a General discharge from the United States Army, became a Canadian citizen, and is free to travel to the U.S.)
- Dick Cotterill
- Michael Shaffer – "After six months in the Army, my application for CO status was denied and I was told that I would be going to Vietnam. I refused to draw my weapon and was ordered court-martialed. On Labour Day 1970 I was able to escape and cross into Canada ... During President Ford's Clemency Program in 1975, I went to Fort Dix seeking the "Undesirable Discharge" offered to deserters who turned themselves in. The Army decided that I wasn't eligible and court-martial proceedings were resumed. With help from the ACLU, I was released and two years later a Federal Court ordered the Army to discharge me Honourably as a Conscientious Objector ... I remained in Vancouver"
- Jack Todd – award-winning sports columnist for the Montreal Gazette
- Mike Tulley – Edmonton, Alberta area sound engineer and social activist

=== Missing-text controversy ===
In February 2009, text on how both draft evaders and resisters of the Vietnam War were ultimately allowed to stay in Canada suddenly vanished from the website of the Department of Citizenship and Immigration Canada."

Originally, the Government of Canada website had contained the following statements:

... Starting in 1965, Canada became a choice haven for American draft resisters and deserters, ... Although some of these transplanted Americans returned home after the Vietnam War, most of them put down roots in Canada, making up the largest, best-educated group this country had ever received.

The above statement (now gone from the website) was part of an extensive online chapter on draft resisters and deserters from the Vietnam war, which was found in the larger online document,"Forging Our Legacy: Canadian Citizenship and Immigration, 1900–1977" It was originally posted on the Government of Canada website in the year 2000, when the Liberal Party of Canada, led by Jean Chrétien, was in power and responsible for the content of that website but in 2009, the Ministry of Stephen Harper [took] "a much dimmer view of dozens of U.S. soldiers who've come north after refusing to serve in the invasion of Iraq. Some had already been deported to face military jail terms ranging from about six to 15 months."

The removal from the Citizenship and Immigration website occurred in the same month that its multi-party counterpart, the Standing Committee on Citizenship and Immigration was debating that issue: On February 12, 2009, that multi-party committee passed, for the second time, a non-binding motion reaffirming Parliament's earlier (June 2008) vote which recommended that the government let Iraq War resisters stay in Canada. A month and a half later, on March 30, 2009, the House of Commons of Canada again voted in a non-binding motion 129 to 125 in favour of the committee's recommendation.

== After the war ==
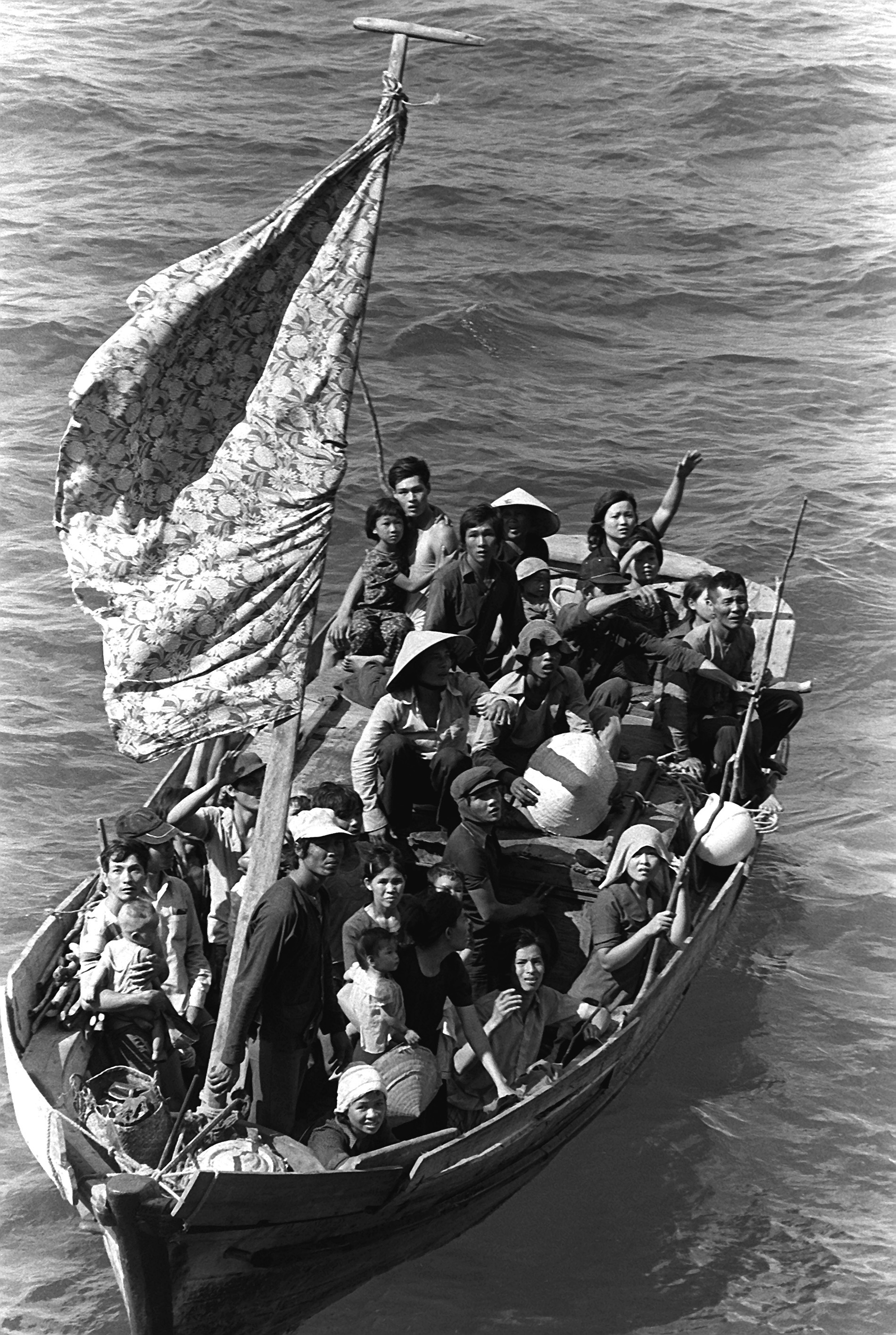
After the war, Canada admitted many Vietnamese boat people as immigrants.

Canada was affected after the war.

=== Vietnamese boat people ===
After the fall of South Vietnam in April 1975, hundreds of thousands of refugees, called boat people, fled Vietnam and adjacent nations. According to Canadian immigration historian Valerie Knowles, from 1979 to 1980 Canada admitted an estimated 60,000 of these refugees, "most of whom had endured several days in small, leaky boats, prey to vicious pirate attacks, before ending up in squalid camps". Knowles says it was the highest number of boat people accepted by any nation, including the United States, during that period. The boat people constituted 25% of all newcomers admitted to Canada from 1978 to 1981. This created a substantial Vietnamese community in Canada, concentrated especially in Montreal, Vancouver, and Toronto.

=== Cultural and political shifts ===
The Vietnam War was an important cultural turning point in Canada. Coupled with Canada's centenary in 1967 and the success of Expo 67, Canada became far more independent and nationalistic. The public, if not their representatives in parliament, became more willing to oppose the United States and to move in a different direction socially and politically.

=== Agent Orange in New Brunswick ===
In 1981, a government report revealed that Agent Orange, the controversial defoliant, had been tested at CFB Gagetown, New Brunswick. In June 1966, the chemical was sprayed over nearly 600 acres (2.4 km^{2}) of forest inside the base. There are differing opinions about the level of toxicity of the site; but, in 2006, the Canadian government said it planned to compensate some of those who were exposed. As of 2011, some claims have been paid but the administration of the compensation program has been criticized.

== See also ==
- Opposition to United States involvement in the Vietnam War
- Baldwin Village – a neighbourhood and commercial street in Toronto that became the centre of the American exile community
- Canada and Iraq War resisters
- Canada–Vietnam relations
- Australia in the Vietnam War
- New Zealand in the Vietnam War
