= Iraq War resisters in Canada =

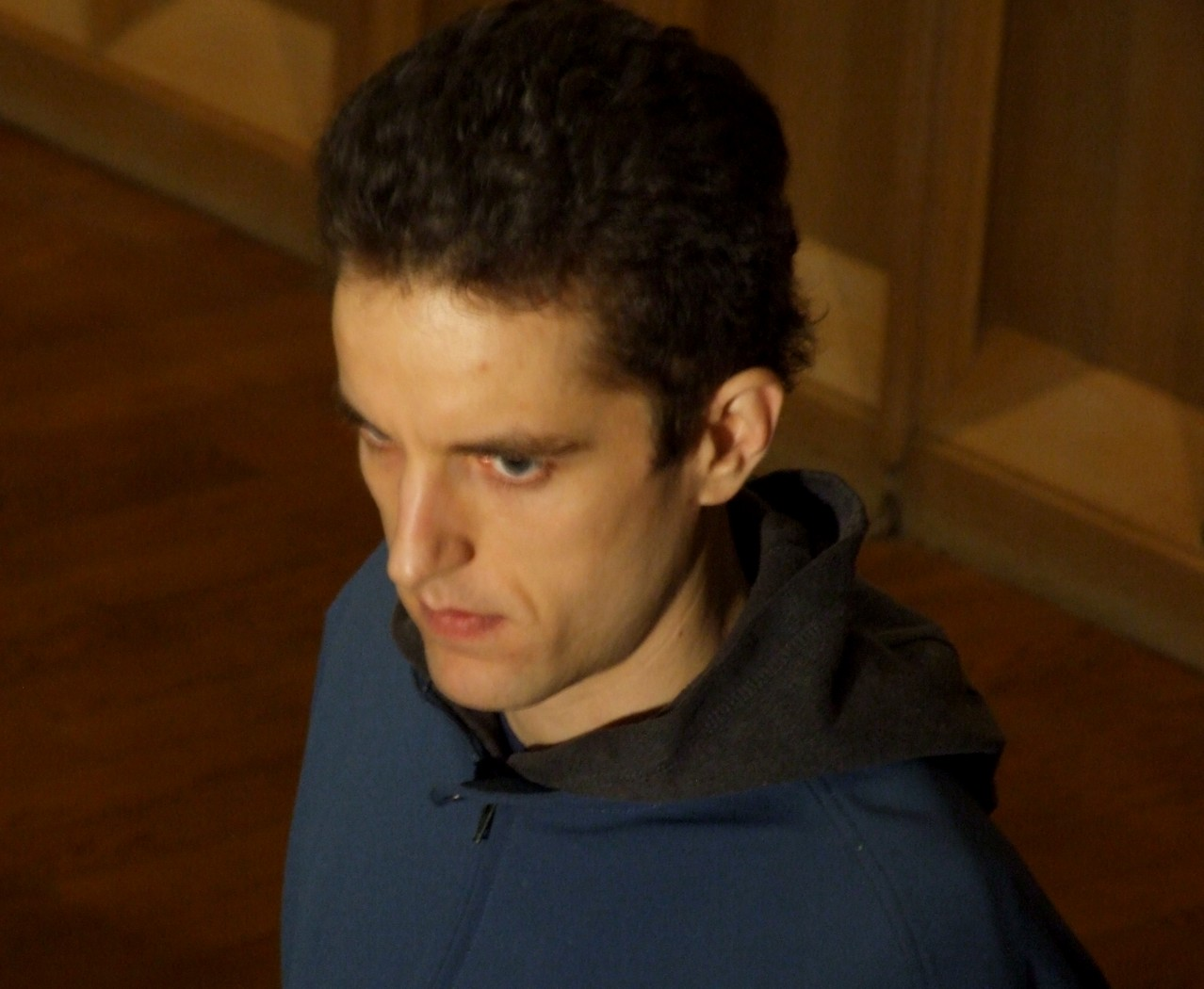
Jeremy Hinzman, the first American Iraq war resister/deserter to publicly seek refugee status in Canada

During the Iraq War, which began with the 2003 invasion of Iraq, there were United States military personnel who refused to participate, or continue to participate, in that specific war. Their refusal meant that they faced the possibility of punishment in the United States according to Article 85 of the US Uniform Code of Military Justice. For that reason some of them chose to go to Canada as a place of refuge. The choice of these US Iraq War resisters to go to Canada has led to considerable debate in Canada's society, press, legal arenas, and political arenas. Much of the debate on this issue has been due to the controversial nature of the Iraq War itself. Among the many elements of that debate are Canada's relationship to the Iraq War, and Canada's relationship to the US, its largest trading partner.

== Background circumstances ==
Some of the Iraq war resisters enlisted in the United States military before the Iraq War, and some enlisted after it began. Before their refusal to participate in that war, some had already initially participated, and some had not. Each had their own reasons for initially deciding to enlist and/or participate in that war. Nevertheless, it's not irrational to assume that the public relations preparations for 2003 invasion of Iraq, and media coverage of the Iraq War played a part in many of those initial decisions. Later, when these soldiers encountered differing views on the 2003 invasion of Iraq and issues of the legality of the Iraq War, they questioned the legitimacy of the 2003 invasion of Iraq. Some of them then became disillusioned with all war, whereas others became "selective conscientious objectors".

Then, at various points in their lives, they became aware of the likelihood of punishment for a refusal to participate in the Iraq War. 6 September 2003 conviction, and concomitant imprisonment, of Iraq War resister Stephen Funk, and other subsequent imprisonments, provided evidence that punishment was a very real possibility.

Eventually, many Iraq War resisters became aware of the history of draft dodgers being allowed into Canada without prosecution during the Vietnam War (1959–1975). In that era, most of those draft dodgers had simply applied for landed immigrant status once in Canada, which opposed its southern neighbour's military adventures in Vietnam. But immigration rules have been tightened since the Vietnam era, making would-be migrants apply from their home countries. This has pushed war resisters into Canada's refugee system.

Unlike draft dodgers who immigrated to Canada as an alternative to mandatory conscription, the Iraq War resisters came to Canada after having voluntarily enlisted. Some of the Iraq War resisters faced the involuntary extension of their active duty service under a stop-loss policy. In any case, there has been some debate about whether or not the voluntary/involuntary enlistment factor even makes a difference in a decision to deport them to face likely punishment in the US. The more important factor, according to the two Parliamentary motions which were passed, was whether or not the individuals "have refused or left military service related to a war not sanctioned by the United Nations ..."

The soldiers who have chosen to come to Canada have been referred to using various terms: "deserter", "conscientious objector", "war resister", or "refugee". The decision to choose one of these terms above another is often an indication of one's position on the issue.

== Legal landscape ==
See also the case for allowing certain qualified war resisters to stay in Canada on Humanitarian and Compassionate Grounds.

=== The Canada/U.S. Extradition Treaty ===
Pursuant to the Treaty between the Government of Canada and the Government of the United States of America on Mutual Legal Assistance in Criminal Matters, US authorities can request Canadian authorities to identify, locate, and take into custody US nationals who have committed a crime that carries a possible sentence of more than a year, and subsequently extradite the target back to the US, as per the Extradition Treaty Between the United States of America and Canada. However, the US government must promise that those extradited will not receive the death penalty, in accordance with the Supreme Court of Canada ruling in United States v. Burns. Thus, deserters who may have had an arrest warrant issued against them in the US are liable for arrest in Canada, unless they legalise their status.

=== Canadian law ===
Under Canadian law, status can be legalized by pursuing a refugee claim, which the Immigration and Refugee Board of Canada (IRB) will consider. If the claim is refused, the claimant can appeal the decision in the Federal Court, the Federal Court of Appeal, and finally, the Supreme Court of Canada, if leave is granted. If, however, appeals do not overturn the decision of the IRB, and if there is a removal order, the claimant must leave Canada within 30 days. If this is not done, or departure details are not confirmed with the Canada Border Services Agency, a deportation order is issued, enforceable by any officer of the Queen's peace in Canada.

On the other hand, if the refugee claim is granted, the individual or family is permitted to remain in Canada, eventually moving on to Permanent Resident status and, if the person wishes, to Canadian citizenship.

== Political involvement during the first legal case progress towards Supreme Court ==
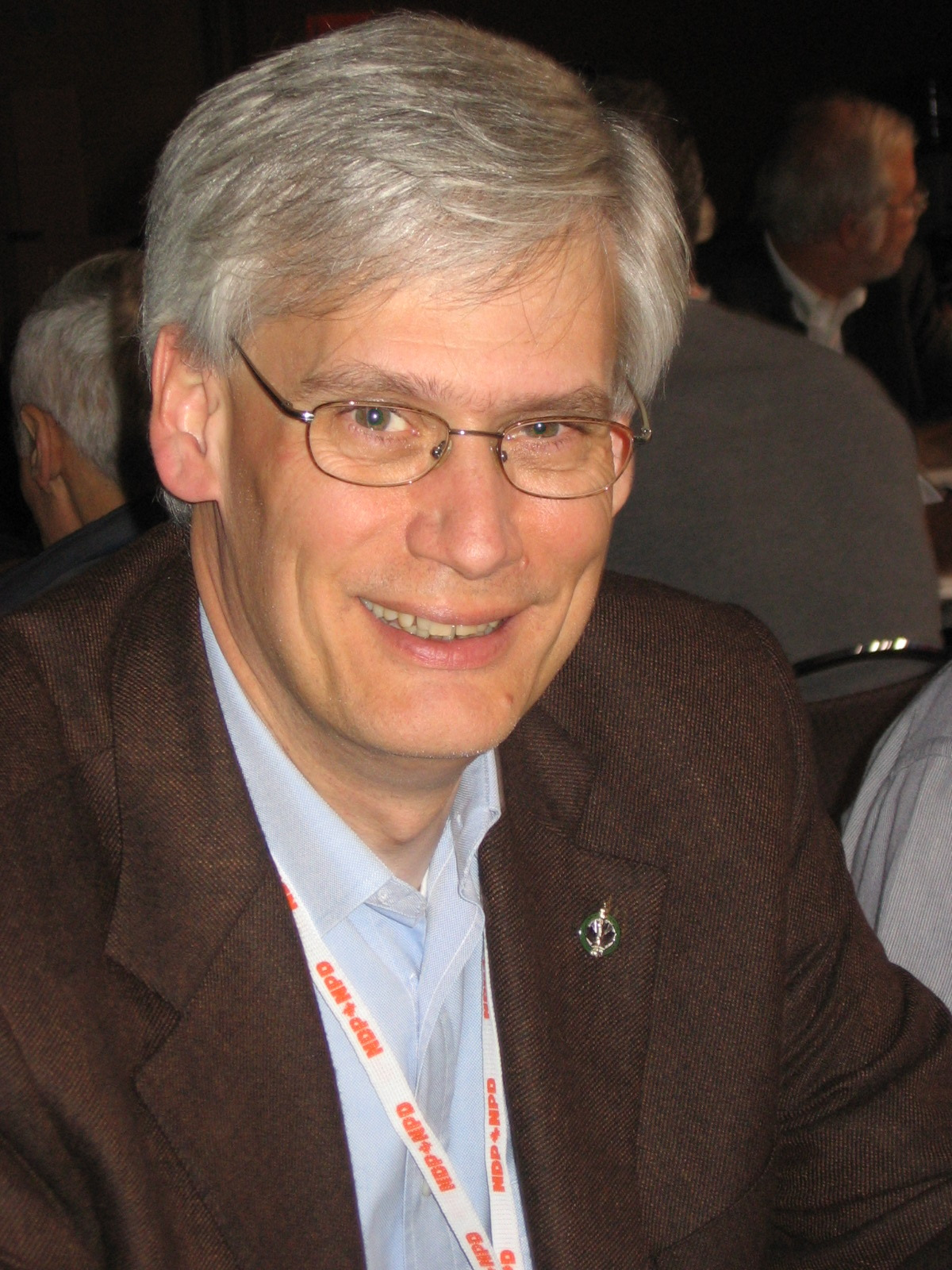
New Democratic Party MP Bill Siksay presented petition to Parliament 21 June 2005.

The case of Iraq War resisters clearly became more than a legal issue when Canadian government lawyers entered the situation and presented arguments to the Immigration and Refugee Board adjudicator just prior to the precedent-setting hearing of Iraq war resister Jeremy Hinzman in November 2004. "Government lawyers argued at Hinzman's immigration hearing that the entire question of the war's legality was "irrelevant". ... The federal immigration officer adjudicating the case [(Brian P. Goodman)] agreed. He ruled [12 November 2004] that Hinzman may not use the legal basis of the Iraq War to justify his ... claim." The claim for refugee status was ultimately rejected (16 March 2005).

Reporting on this decision, the BBC stated that the ruling "did not come as a surprise. ... [Canadian] officials are aware that accusing Washington of persecuting its own citizens would cause an international diplomatic incident". The government at the time was the Liberal Party of Canada led by Prime Minister Paul Martin; and the lawyer representing that government's Minister of Citizenship and Immigration, Judy Sgro, was Janet Chisholm.

During that government's Parliamentary session, which ended 29 November 2005, the issue would also officially become part of Parliament business: On 21 June 2005, New Democratic Party Member of Parliament Bill Siksay presented to Parliament a petition of 15,000 signatures urging the Liberal government to allow Iraq War resisters to remain in Canada. This petition had been organized by the community-based War Resisters Support Campaign.

== First legal case: Jeremy Hinzman ==
Jeremy Hinzman, "the first American Iraq War resister to seek refugee status in Canada", filed a refugee claim upon his arrival in Canada, in January 2004.

=== Hearing at the Immigration and Refugee Board of Canada ===
Hinzman's first hearing was held from 6 to 8 December 2004 at the Immigration and Refugee Board of Canada presided over by Brian P. Goodman.

Hinzman's lawyer Jeffry House pointed out a precedent set by federal court Judge Arthur Stone in 1995 who approved refugee status for a deserter from Iraq's 1990 invasion of Kuwait. Stone wrote, "There is a range of military activity which is simply never permissible in that it violates basic international standards. This includes ... non-defensive incursions into foreign territory."

But before the hearing started, however, Goodman had already ruled that the evidence with respect to the legality of the US embarking on military action in Iraq could not be used as an admissible argument in Hinzman's hearing. He did so after hearing government lawyers argue "that the entire question of the war's legality was "irrelevant." The claim for refugee status was ultimately rejected.

=== Federal Court appeal ===
Justice Anne L. Mactavish presided over the Federal Court case of Hinzman v. Canada, and released her ruling on 31 March 2006 upholding the decision of the Immigration and Refugee Board.

In her decision, Mactavish addressed the issue of personal responsibility as follows: "An individual must be involved at the policy-making level to be culpable for a crime against peace ... the ordinary foot soldier is not expected to make his or her own personal assessment as to the legality of a conflict. Similarly, such an individual cannot be held criminally responsible for fighting in support of an illegal war, assuming that his or her personal war-time conduct is otherwise proper."

"The main arguments advanced by Hinzman's lawyer, Jeffry House, [were] that the war in Iraq is against international law and that Hinzman ... would have been forced to participate in unlawful acts had he gone."

=== Supreme Court of Canada ===
On 15 November 2007, a Coram of the Supreme Court of Canada made of Justices Michel Bastarache, Rosalie Abella, and Louise Charron refused an application to have the Court hear the case on appeal, without giving reasons.

== Political aftermath after Hinzman reaches Supreme Court ==
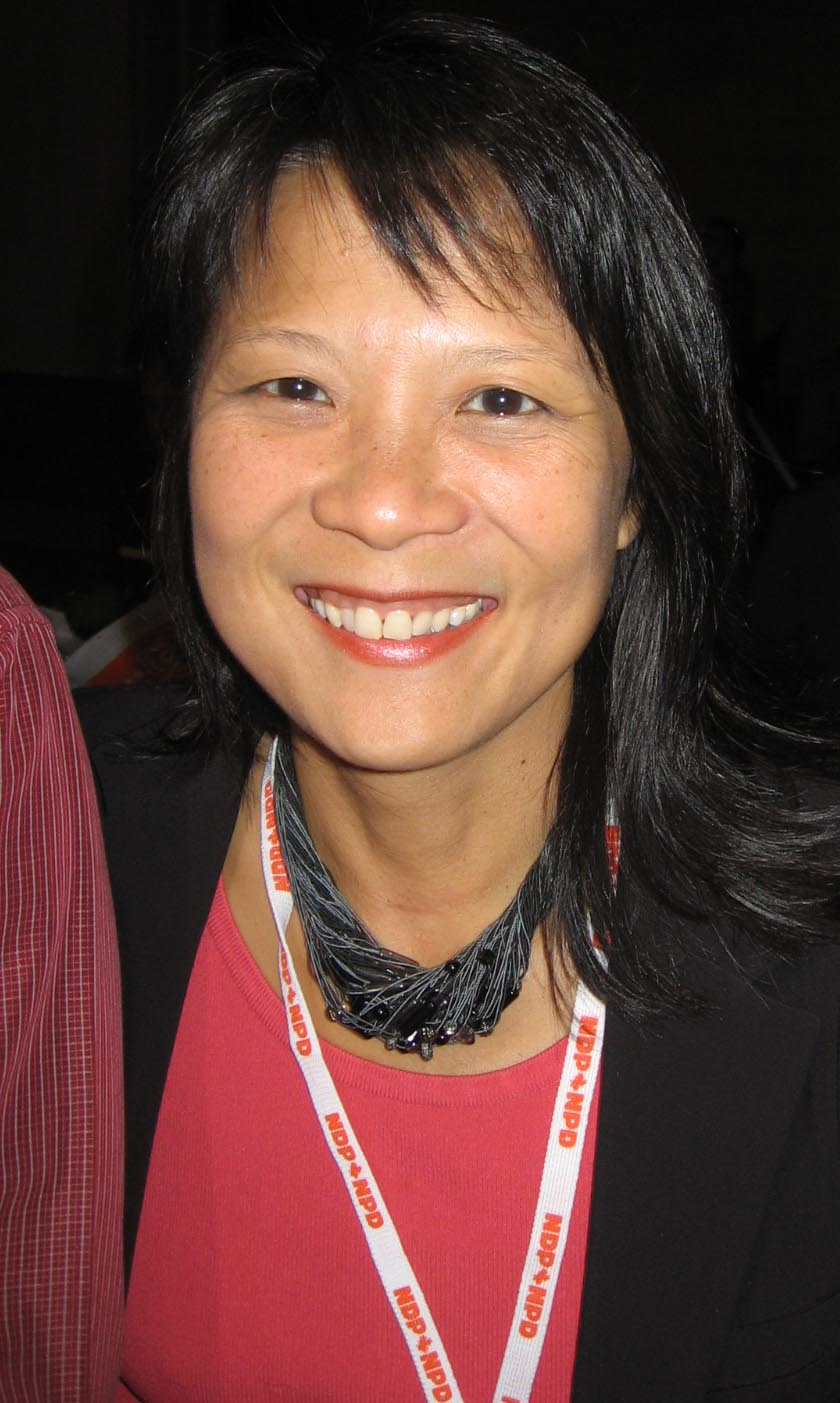
NDP MP Olivia Chow presented motion in Parliament.

"In the wake of the Supreme Court's decision, NDP immigration critic Olivia Chow asked the federal standing committee on citizenship and immigration to vote in favour of allowing conscientious objectors who have refused or left American military service in Iraq to be allowed to stay in Canada."

On 6 December 2007, after some amendments to Chow's original motion, the parliamentary Standing Committee on Citizenship and Immigration adopted a motion stating: That the committee recommend ...

that the government immediately implement a program to allow conscientious objectors and their immediate family members (partners and dependents), who have refused or left military service related to a war not sanctioned by the United Nations and do not have a criminal record, to apply for permanent resident status and remain in Canada; and that the government should immediately cease any removal or deportation actions that may have already commenced against such individuals.

=== House of Commons support war resisters motion ===
On 21 May 2008, US Iraq War resister Corey Glass, who had applied for refugee status 22 months earlier, was ordered deported and told that he must leave the country voluntarily by 12 June 2008.

The rejection ... was based on a failed pre-removal risk assessment by Citizenship and Immigration Canada, which found that, if removed from the country, Glass would not be at immediate risk of death, torture, or cruel or unusual treatment or punishment.

...

This first rejection could be a chilling sign of things to come for at least nine other war resisters who have requested a pre-removal risk assessment, Zaslofsky said, and could shut the door to other war resisters' attempts to find a home in Canada.

On 3 June 2008, the House of Commons passed the motion (137 to 110) which recommended that the government immediately implement a program which would "allow conscientious objectors ... to a war not sanctioned by the United Nations ... to ... remain in Canada ..." All parties and all independent members of parliament supported the motion, except for Conservative MPs.

However, the next day, the Toronto Star reported that "the motion is non-binding and the victory was bittersweet as the government is likely to ignore it. The motion – which passed 137–110 – comes about a week before 25-year-old Corey Glass is supposed to leave Canada voluntarily after the former national guardsman was rejected as a refugee and ordered out of the country."

=== Federal court orders a new IRB hearing for Joshua Key ===
On 4 July 2008, Joshua Key won a Federal Court appeal thus forcing the Immigration and Refugee Board of Canada (IRB) to re-examine his claim for refugee status in Canada. This was "an unprecedented court ruling that could affect scores of other U.S. soldiers who have refused to fight in Iraq."

=== Canada's first deportation of an Iraq War resister ===
On 9 July 2008 the Toronto Star reported that Corey Glass "is [now] permitted to remain in Canada until the Federal Court makes a decision on ... cases for judicial review."

On 15 July 2008, after the Parliamentary recommendation had been in front of the minority Conservative government for a month and a half, Canada deported Iraq War resister Robin Long. This made him the first U.S. soldier to be deported from Canada to the United States.

One day later, Daniel Sandate, another U.S. soldier, was also deported. Sandate had not applied for legal refugee status as had Long (see details).

=== Government statements on Iraq War resister Jeremy Hinzman, and the Iraq War ===
The day before Hinzman was to have been deported, "Immigration Minister, Diane Finley said ... the government would not intervene if the courts deny his ... request [to remain in Canada]." By the time she made this statement, it was public knowledge that the first deportee, Robin Long, had already been sentenced to fifteen months of imprisonment. He was sentenced 22 August 2008, a month before Diane Finley's statement.

Eleven days after Diane Finley's comments there was a nationally televised election debate in which the Conservative party leader Prime Minister Stephen Harper was pressed by Gilles Duceppe into answering a question about his position on the Iraq War: Harper said he erred in calling for Canada's participation in the 2003 U.S.-led invasion of Iraq. At the time, he was Opposition leader. "It was absolutely an error, it's obviously clear," said Harper, adding that the claim of weapons of mass destruction proved false."

== Events during 40th Canadian Parliament ==
After the 40th Canadian Parliament began, the whole process of presenting the war resisters motion had to begin again in order for it to apply to the new Parliament. After coming close to forming a coalition government, Members of the opposition parties confirmed on 21 January 2009, that, if they were in power together in a coalition government, then 3 June 2008 Parliamentary recommendation concerning war resisters would be implemented.

=== Deportations and imprisonments continue ===
On 23 January 2009, Chris Teske was the first war resister to be forced out of Canada who had applied for legal refugee status and did not "fail to comply with bail conditions" as an earlier deportee Robin Long had.

On 4 February 2009, Clifford Cornell was also forced out of Canada. He "was arrested on Wednesday after crossing the border from Canada into Washington State." On 23 February 2009, Cornell was charged with the crime of desertion with the intent to "avoid hazardous duty and shirk important service" On 29 April 2009, Clifford was convicted of desertion and sentenced to one year in prison."

Cornell was the first deported Iraq war resister to be charged, convicted and sentenced by the United States Military while Barack Obama was its Commander in Chief. His sentence was later reduced to 11 months by the Fort Stewart post commander.

=== Joshua Key's new hearing at the IRB ===
On 3 June 2009, Joshua Key had a new hearing in front of the Immigration and Refugee Board. Ken Atkinson, the immigration board member who then heard Key's case on 3 June 2009, reserved his decision. However, on 30 July 2010, Key was again denied refugee status in this second IRB ruling.

== The case for allowing certain qualified war resisters to stay in Canada on Humanitarian and Compassionate Grounds ==
=== The case of Jeremy Hinzman ===
Legally different and distinct from a "refugee claim," is an application to stay in Canada on "Humanitarian and Compassionate Grounds" (H&C). War resister Jeremy Hinzman's case was the first to test this distinction:

On 6 July 2010, the Canadian Federal Court of Appeal ruled unanimously that a Canadian immigration official failed to consider the "hardships" of Hinzman when she denied him permanent residence in Canada. The court said the official's rejection of Hinzman's permanent residence application was "significantly flawed" because the officer did not take into consideration Hinzman's "strong moral and religious beliefs" against participation in war. That means officials must take another look at Hinzman's application to remain in Canada on humanitarian and compassionate grounds.

Hinzman's lawyer, Alyssa Manning, said, "This officer missed the point and only considered refugee-type questions." Refugee cases typically only consider risk to life or risk of persecution. "An H&C [officer] is supposed to consider humanitarian and compassionate values – the questions inherent with a H&C application," Manning said. "Hinzman's beliefs, his whole reasons for being in Canada in the first place, weren't considered by the H&C officer, and that's what was significantly flawed about [the officer's] decision."

=== The case of Dean Walcott ===
On 5 April 2011, in a similar situation, the Federal Court ruled in favor of Dean Walcott who was seeking a judicial review of his previous application to remain in Canada on humanitarian grounds. He can now reapply to remain in Canada.

== See also ==
Links relevant to those claiming refugee status in Canada

- Canadian immigration and refugee law
- Canadian nationality law
- Immigration and Refugee Protection Act
- Immigration to Canada
- Permanent resident
- Refugee Law
- Temporary resident

General

- Canada and the Iraq War
- Category:Conscientious objectors
- List of Iraq War Resisters
- Nuremberg Defense
- Pacifism
- The right to refuse to kill
- War Resisters' International
