= Nuremberg principles =

Guidelines for determining what constitutes a war crime

The Nuremberg principles are a set of guidelines for determining what constitutes a war crime. The document was created by the International Law Commission of the United Nations to codify the legal principles underlying the Nuremberg Trials of Nazi party members following World War II.

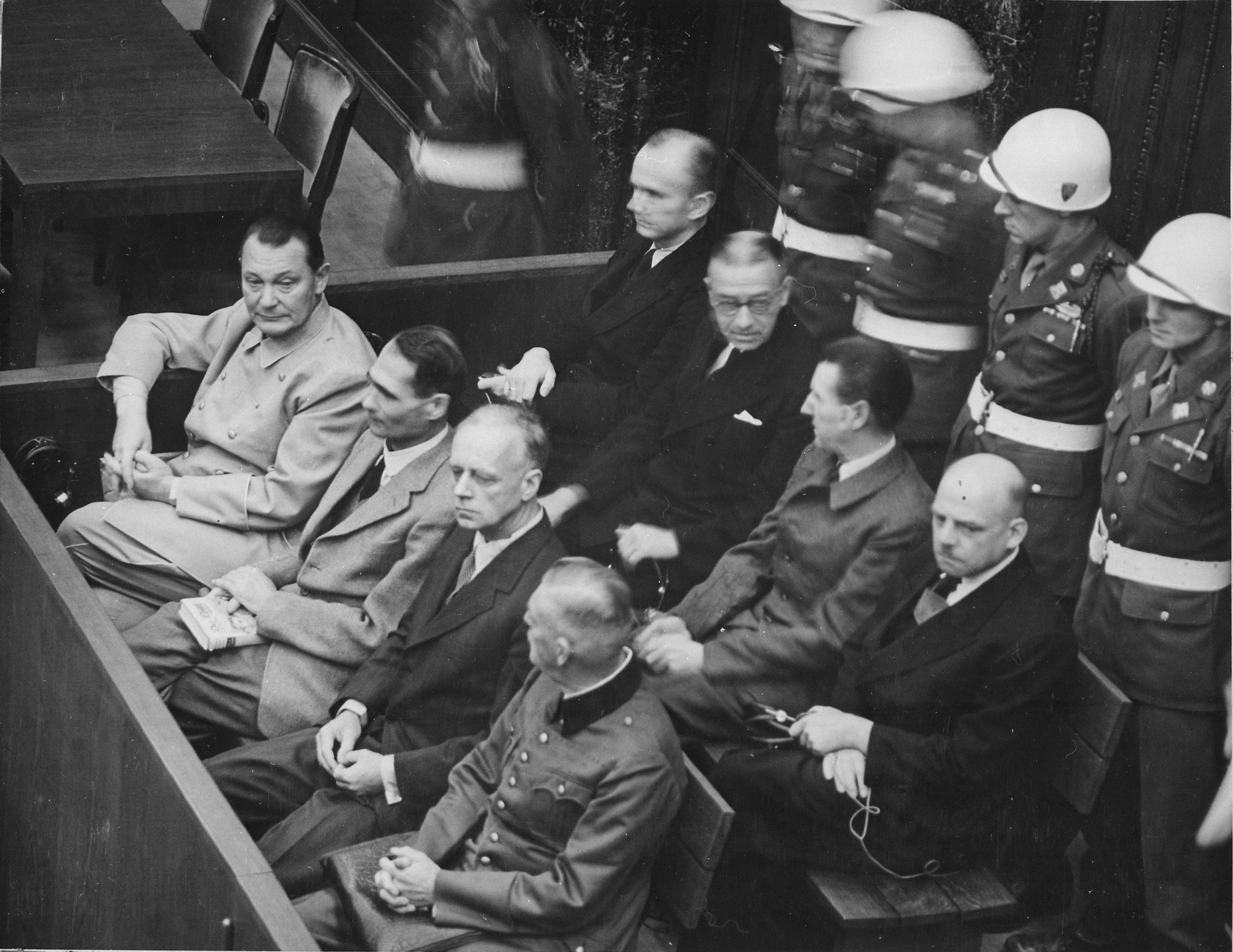
Group of defendants at the Nuremberg trials, from which the Nuremberg principles were established

== The principles ==
=== Principle I ===
Any person who commits an act which constitutes a crime under international law is responsible therefor and liable to punishment.

=== Principle II ===
The fact that internal law does not impose a penalty for an act which constitutes a crime under international law does not relieve the person who committed the act from responsibility under international law.

=== Principle III ===
The fact that a person who committed an act which constitutes a crime under international law, acted as Head of State or responsible government official, does not relieve him from responsibility under international law.

=== Principle IV ===
The fact that a person acted pursuant to order of his Government or of a superior does not relieve him from responsibility under international law, provided a moral choice was in fact possible to him.

This principle could be paraphrased as follows: "It is not an acceptable excuse to say 'I was just following my superior's orders'".

Previous to the time of the Nuremberg Trials, this excuse was known in common parlance as "superior orders". After the prominent, high-profile event of the Nuremberg Trials, that excuse is now referred to by many as the "Nuremberg Defense". In recent times, a third term, "lawful orders" has become common parlance for some people. All three terms are in use today, and they all have slightly different nuances of meaning, depending on the context in which they are used.

Nuremberg Principle IV is legally supported by the jurisprudence found in certain articles in the Universal Declaration of Human Rights which deal indirectly with conscientious objection. It is also supported by the principles found in paragraph 171 of the Handbook on Procedures and Criteria for Determining Refugee Status which was issued by the Office of the United Nations High Commissioner for Refugees (UNHCR). Those principles deal with the conditions under which conscientious objectors can apply for refugee status in another country if they face persecution in their own country for refusing to participate in an illegal war.

=== Principle V ===
Any person charged with a crime under international law has the right to a fair trial on the facts and law.

=== Principle VI ===
The crimes hereinafter set out are punishable as crimes under international law:

(a) Crimes against peace:

(i) Planning, preparation, initiation or waging of a war of aggression or a war in violation of international treaties, agreements or assurances;

(ii) Participation in a common plan or conspiracy for the accomplishment of any of the acts mentioned under (i).

(b) War crimes:

Violations of the laws or customs of war which include, but are not limited to, murder, ill-treatment or deportation to slave labor or for any other purpose of civilian population of or in occupied territory; murder or ill-treatment of prisoners of war or persons on the Seas, killing of hostages, plunder of public or private property, wanton destruction of cities, towns, or villages, or devastation not justified by military necessity.

(c) Crimes against humanity:

Murder, extermination, enslavement, deportation and other inhumane acts done against any civilian population, or persecutions on political, racial, or religious grounds, when such acts are done or such persecutions are carried on in execution of or in connection with any crime against peace or any war crime.
Leaders, organizers, instigators and accomplices participating in the formulation or execution of a common plan or conspiracy to commit any of the foregoing crimes are responsible for all acts performed by any persons in execution of such plan.

=== Principle VII ===
Complicity in the commission of a crime against peace, a war crime, or a crime against humanity as set forth in Principle VI is a crime under international law.

== The principles' power or lack of power ==
In the period just prior to the June 26, 1945 signing of the Charter of the United Nations, the governments participating in its drafting were opposed to conferring on the United Nations legislative power to enact binding rules of international law. As a corollary, they also rejected proposals to confer on the General Assembly the power to impose certain general conventions on states by some form of majority vote. There was, however, strong support for conferring on the General Assembly the more limited powers of study and recommendation, which led to the adoption of Article 13 in Chapter IV of the Charter. It obliges the United Nations General Assembly to initiate studies and to make recommendations that encourage the progressive development of international law and its codification. The Nuremberg Principles were developed by UN organs under that limited mandate.

Unlike treaty law, customary international law is not written. To prove that a certain rule is customary one has to show that it is reflected in state practice and that there exists a conviction in the international community that such practice is required as a matter of law. (For example, the Nuremberg Trials were a "practice" of the "international law" of the Nuremberg Principles; and that "practice" was supported by the international community.) In this context, "practice" relates to official state practice and therefore includes formal statements by states. A contrary practice by some states is possible. If this contrary practice is condemned by other states then the rule is confirmed.

In 1947, under UN General Assembly Resolution 177 (II), paragraph (a), the International Law Commission was directed to "formulate the principles of international law recognized in the Charter of the Nuremberg Tribunal and in the judgment of the Tribunal." In the course of the consideration of this subject, the question arose as to whether or not the commission should ascertain to what extent the principles contained in the Charter and judgment constituted principles of international law. The conclusion was that since the Nuremberg Principles had been affirmed by the General Assembly, the task entrusted to the commission was not to express any appreciation of these principles as principles of international law but merely to formulate them. The text above was adopted by the Commission at its second session. The Report of the commission also contains commentaries on the principles (see Yearbook of the International Law Commission, 1950, Vol. II, pp. 374–378).

== Examples of the principles supported and not supported ==
=== The 1998 Rome Statute of the International Criminal Court ===
Concerning Nuremberg Principle IV, and its reference to an individual's responsibility, it could be argued that a version of the Superior Orders defense can be found as a defense to international crimes in the Rome Statute of the International Criminal Court. (The Rome Statute was agreed upon in 1998 as the foundational document of the International Criminal Court, established to try those individuals accused of serious international crimes.) Article 33, titled "Superior Orders and prescription of law," states:

1. The fact that a crime within the jurisdiction of the Court has been committed by a person pursuant to an order of a Government or of a superior, whether military or civilian, shall not relieve that person of criminal responsibility unless:

- (a) The person was under a legal obligation to obey orders of the Government or the superior in question;
- (b) The person did not know that the order was unlawful; and
- (c) The order was not manifestly unlawful.

2. For the purposes of this article, orders to commit genocide or crimes against humanity are manifestly unlawful.

There are two interpretations of this Article:

- This formulation, especially (1)(a), whilst effectively prohibiting the use of the Nuremberg Defense in relation to charges of genocide and crimes against humanity, does however, appear to allow the Nuremberg Defense to be used as a protection against charges of war crimes, provided the relevant criteria are met.
- Nevertheless, this interpretation of ICC Article 33 is open to debate: For example, Article 33 (1)(c) protects the defendant only if "the order was not manifestly unlawful." The "order" could be considered "unlawful" if we consider Nuremberg Principle IV to be the applicable "law" in this case. If so, then the defendant is not protected. Discussion as to whether or not Nuremberg Principle IV is the applicable law in this case is found in a discussion of the Nuremberg Principles' power or lack of power.

=== Canada ===
Nuremberg Principle IV, and its reference to an individual's responsibility, was also at issue in Canada in the case of Hinzman v. Canada. Jeremy Hinzman was a U.S. Army deserter who claimed refugee status in Canada as a conscientious objector, one of many Iraq War resisters. Hinzman's lawyer, Jeffry House, had previously raised the issue of the legality of the Iraq War as having a bearing on their case. The Federal Court ruling was released on March 31, 2006, and denied the refugee status claim. In the decision, Justice Anne L. Mactavish addressed the issue of personal responsibility:

An individual must be involved at the policy-making level to be culpable for a crime against peace ... the ordinary foot soldier is not expected to make his or her own personal assessment as to the legality of a conflict. Similarly, such an individual cannot be held criminally responsible for fighting in support of an illegal war, assuming that his or her personal war-time conduct is otherwise proper.

On Nov 15, 2007, a quorum of the Supreme Court of Canada consisting of Justices Michel Bastarache, Rosalie Abella, and Louise Charron refused an application to have the Court hear the case on appeal, without giving reasons.

== See also ==
- Command responsibility
- Geneva Conventions
- International Criminal Court
- International legal theory
- Laws of war
- London Charter of the International Military Tribunal
- Nuremberg Code
- Nuremberg Trials
- Rule of Law in Armed Conflicts Project
- Rule of law
- Rule According to Higher Law
- Sources of international law
