= Jeffry House =

Canadian lawyer

Jeffry A. House (born December 29, 1946) is a retired lawyer who practiced in Toronto, Ontario, Canada. He is best known for his efforts on behalf and representation of fugitive American soldiers and Indigenous protesters.

== American soldiers ==
House represented American soldiers applying for refugee status in Canada after they deserted the American military during the Iraq War, including Jeremy Hinzman, Josh Key, Kyle Snyder, and Brandon Hughey. The cases of Jeremy Hinzman and Brandon Hughey were heard and rejected by the Immigration and Refugee Board of Canada, the Federal Court of Canada, and the Federal Court of Appeal, while the Supreme Court of Canada refused to hear the appeal.

The presence of US Army deserters in Canada was widely reported in the international news media, as well as in Canada and in the United States. During the Vietnam War, upwards of 60,000 U.S. draft evaders and military deserters found refuge in Canada.

== Indigenous protesters ==
House has represented Indigenous protesters involved in the Ipperwash Crisis in Ipperwash Provincial Park, Ontario in 1995, especially Nick Cottrelle and Warren George, with the matter ending in an acquittal of the accused.

== Biography ==
Jeffry House grew up in Milwaukee, Wisconsin. After a year as an exchange student in Norway, he graduated from the University of Wisconsin–Madison in 1969. House was drafted into the US Armed Forces during the Vietnam War. In January 1970, House evaded the military draft and moved to Canada.

House received a master's degree in Political Theory from York University and a Law Degree from the Osgoode Hall Law School in Toronto, Ontario, Canada. He practiced law for four decades. For six years, House served on the quasi-judicial tribunal enforcing the Ontario Human Rights Code. His decisions involve an early gay rights case in which spousal benefits were awarded to same sex partners (Clinton & Mercaz), and the Northwestern General Hospital case, where Crown disclosure obligation was held to apply in Human Rights cases.

In 1991, House was counsel on the Osborne decision in the Supreme Court of Canada which struck down the law which prevented public employees from participating in after-work political activities.

== See also ==
- Canada and Iraq War resisters
- Indigenous peoples
- List of anti-war organizations
- List of Iraq War resisters
- Nuremberg Principles
- Nuremberg Principles, successes and failures in preserving the Principles, Canada

== Audio and video resources ==
- Canadian Broadcasting Corporation "Digital Archives" – Seeking Sanctuary: Draft Dodgers
- National Film Board of Canada – Breaking Ranks; The Documentary
