= Jeremy Hinzman =

American deserter and Iraq War resister (born 1979)

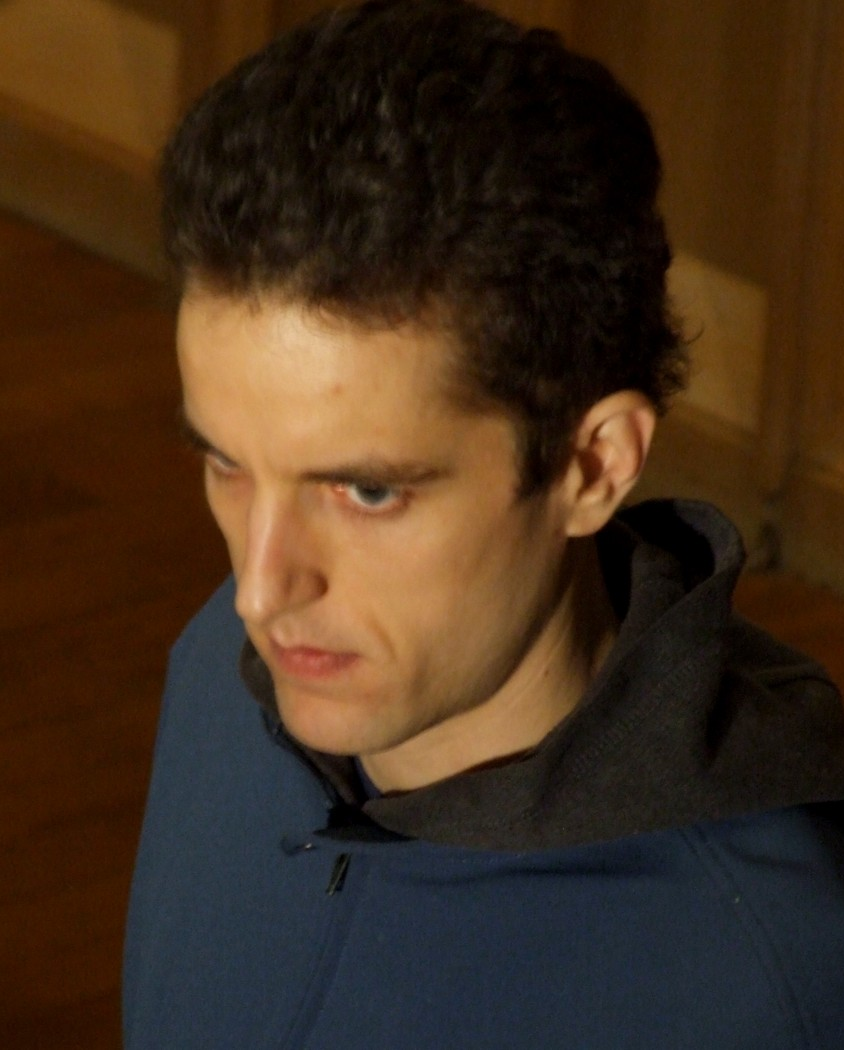
- Hinzman at a 2008 speaking engagement
- Born: Jeremy Dean Hinzman; 1979 (age 46–47); Rapid City, South Dakota, U.S.
- Known for: Resisting Iraq War
- Spouse: Nga Thi Nguyen

Jeremy Dean Hinzman (born 1979) is an Iraq War resister who was the first American deserter to seek refugee status in Canada.

Born in Rapid City, South Dakota, Hinzman enlisted in the U.S. Army as a paratrooper with the 82nd Airborne Division and deserted in 2004 to avoid participating in the Iraq War. He fled to Canada with his wife and preschool-age son. Now living in Toronto and working as a bike courier, Hinzman faces a court-martial and a possible five-year prison sentence if he returns to the United States. He said he sought refugee status because he opposed the war in Iraq on moral grounds and argued the U.S. invasion violated international human rights standards."

He was one of the first to have his application for refugee status rejected—a decision he unsuccessfully appealed to the Federal Court and the Federal Court of Appeal. His request to appeal the decision to the Supreme Court was rejected in November 2007. At that time, he filed for a pre-removal risk assessment with Citizenship and Immigration Canada, which determines if a denied refugee applicant would be subject to torture, death or a risk of cruel and unusual treatment or punishment if returned to their country of origin.

Distinct from his application for refugee status, he also filed for permanent residency on "humanitarian and compassionate grounds."

== Military service ==
Jeremy Hinzman voluntarily joined the U.S. Army early in 2001, completing basic combat training and airborne school in Fort Benning, Georgia.

Along with his wife, Nga Nguyen, he began attending meetings of the Religious Society of Friends in January 2002. His newfound pacifist beliefs and the birth of his son, Liam, in May 2002, were among the reasons he cited for applying for conscientious objector status in August 2002. Amnesty International notes that Hinzman "took reasonable steps to register his conscientious objection through seeking non-combatant status in [August] 2002, an application which was rejected [April 2003]." This means that he tried for eight months, unsuccessfully, to be officially and legally referred to as a "conscientious objector".

His unit was deployed to take part in the war in Afghanistan later in 2002. Hinzman fulfilled a non-combat role there while his conscientious objector application was being processed. It was ultimately denied, and he then returned to his regular unit, serving as its armorer. When his unit received orders to join in the Iraq War, Hinzman deserted, crossing the border into Canada with his wife and son.

== Life in Canada ==
He filed a refugee claim upon his arrival in Canada, in January 2004. He was one of at least 28 soldiers actively seeking refugee status in Canada after deserting the United States military out of opposition to the Iraq conflict. While waiting for various legal decisions to be made on his case, Hinzman and his family continued to live in Toronto, Ontario. Hinzman, along with fellow deserter Brandon Hughey, has become a popular figure in the anti-war movement. He occasionally travels to other Canadian cities to speak on campuses and at peace rallies. Hinzman has also drawn criticism, and during his hearing stated that he has received death threats from American citizens.

If and when his legal options are exhausted, Hinzman will then face the prospect of deportation from Canada and extradition to U.S. military custody. If he is ultimately deported, he faces court-martial in the U.S. Army. If the Army pursues a general court-martial, he could be sentenced to the punishment of up to five years in prison and a dishonorable discharge for the crime of "desertion with intent to avoid hazardous duty or to shirk important service."

In a 12 May 2005 media briefing, Amnesty International stated:

Amnesty International considers Mr Jeremy Hinzman to have a genuine conscientious objection to serving as a combatant in the U.S. forces in Iraq. Amnesty International further considers that he took reasonable steps to register his conscientious objection through seeking non-combatant status in 2002, an application which was rejected. Accordingly, should he be imprisoned upon his return to the United States, Amnesty International would consider him to be a prisoner of conscience.

== Experience with the Canadian legal and political systems ==
=== Hearing at the Immigration and Refugee Board of Canada ===
Hinzman's first hearing was held from December 6 to December 8, 2004, at the Immigration and Refugee Board of Canada (IRB), presided over by Coram Brian P. Goodman. It was the first of similar refugee applications.

His lawyer, Jeffry House, pointed out a precedent set by federal court Judge Arthur Stone in 1995 who approved refugee status for a deserter from Iraq's 1990 invasion of Kuwait. Stone wrote, "There is a range of military activity which is simply never permissible in that it violates basic international standards. This includes ... non-defensive incursions into foreign territory."

The case of Iraq War resisters became more than a legal issue when Canadian government lawyers entered the situation and presented arguments to the IRB adjudicator just before this precedent-setting hearing. "Government lawyers argued at Hinzman's immigration hearing that the entire question of the war's legality was 'irrelevant.'... The federal immigration officer adjudicating the case [Brian P. Goodman] agreed. He ruled [November 12, 2004] that Hinzman may not use the legal basis of the Iraq War to justify his...claim." The claim for refugee status was ultimately rejected. The government at the time was the Liberal Party of Canada led by Prime Minister Paul Martin; and the lawyer representing that government's Minister of Citizenship and Immigration, Judy Sgro, was Janet Chisholm.

Reporting on Goodman's decision, the BBC stated that the ruling "did not come as a surprise...[Canadian] officials are aware that accusing Washington of persecuting its citizens would cause an international diplomatic incident."

=== Federal Court Appeal ===
Justice Anne L. Mactavish presided over the Federal Court case of Hinzman v. Canada, 2006 FC 420, and released her ruling on 31 March 2006, upholding the decision of the Immigration and Refugee Board.

In her decision, Mactavish addressed the issue of personal responsibility as follows:

An individual must be involved at the policy-making level to be culpable for a crime against peace...the ordinary foot soldier is not expected to make his or her personal assessment as to the legality of a conflict. Similarly, such an individual cannot be held criminally responsible for fighting in support of an illegal war, assuming that his or her war-time conduct is otherwise proper.

Alex Neve, who taught international human rights and refugee law at Osgoode Hall Law School, expressed concern that Mactavish's decision sets a precedent whereby "those at senior levels who have an objection to war may [seek refugee status], and those who deploy who have an objection may not. This runs contrary to other international law rulings." One of those rulings is Nuremberg Principle IV, which reads, "The fact that a person acted under order of his Government or of a superior does not relieve him from responsibility under international law, provided a moral choice was, in fact, possible to him."

"The main arguments advanced by Hinzman's lawyer, Jeffry House, [were] that the war in Iraq is against international law and that Hinzman ... would have been forced to participate in unlawful acts had he gone."

=== Supreme Court of Canada ===
On 15 November 2007, a quorum of the Supreme Court of Canada made of Justices Michel Bastarache, Rosalie Abella, and Louise Charron refused an application to have the Court hear the case on appeal, without giving reasons.

In an editorial for the Ottawa Citizen, Lawrence Hill accused the courts of a double standard concerning the 1995 decision where the Federal Court of Appeal granted refugee status to a deserter from Iraq.

=== Political aftermath in 2007 and 2008 ===
Following the Supreme Court's decision, NDP immigration critic Olivia Chow asked the parliamentary Standing Committee on Citizenship and Immigration to vote in favour of allowing conscientious objectors who refused or left U.S. military service in Iraq to be allowed to stay in Canada.

On 6 December 2007, after some amendments to Chow's original motion, the Standing Committee adopted a motion recommending that:

the government immediately implement a program to allow conscientious objectors and their immediate family members (partners and dependents), who have refused or left military service related to a war not sanctioned by the United Nations and do not have a criminal record, to apply for permanent resident status and remain in Canada; and that the government should immediately cease any removal or deportation actions that may have already commenced against such individuals.

On 3 June 2008, the House of Commons passed a motion (137 to 110) that recommended the government immediately implement a program which would "allow conscientious objectors...to a war not sanctioned by the United Nations...to...remain in Canada." The motion gained international attention from the New York Times, Britain's BBC, and the New Zealand press.

On July 22 that year, Officer S. Parr issued a negative decision on the Hinzman application to stay in Canada on "humanitarian and compassionate grounds." On July 25, she also issued a distinctly separate negative decision on the Hinzman application to stay in Canada as refugees (in their "Pre-Removal Risk Assessment").

That following August 13, the Canada Border Services Agency ordered Hinzman, along with his wife, son, and baby daughter, to leave the country by 23 September 2008. In response to that order, at a press conference on September 18, Bob Rae, the Liberal Foreign Affairs Critic, joined Hinzman to make an urgent appeal to the Conservative government to stop the imminent deportation of Hinzman and his family. He also urged the government to support a motion passed earlier that year by all parties, except the Conservatives, to let all eligible conscientious objectors take up permanent residence.

=== Stay of deportation ===
On 22 September 2008, Hinzman and his family were granted a stay of deportation at the last minute by a Federal Court judge while the court decided whether to hear their appeal. The judge's decision would allow the family to remain in Toronto while the court decided whether to review a decision by Citizenship and Immigration officials not to let the Hinzmans remain in Canada on "humanitarian and compassionate grounds." (This was a distinctly separate legal effort from the refugee application and its accompanying Pre-Removal Risk Assessment.)

At the hearing on that day, Hinzman's lawyer Alyssa Manning told Justice Richard Mosley that new evidence demonstrated that outspoken critics of the American-led invasion of Iraq in 2003 faced harsher treatment than other deserters. For example, she said, deserter Robin Long was sentenced to 15 months in prison the previous month after prosecutors made mention of a media interview he had given in Canada before he was deported in July.

The issue of "differential" treatment for those who had spoken out against the U.S.-led invasion appeared to trouble Justice Mosley, who said: "I don't know how it is an aggravating feature or element to be introduced in sentencing." In his 3-page endorsement, Mosley said: "Based on the evidence and submissions before me, I am satisfied that the applicants would suffer irreparable harm if a stay were not granted pending determination of their leave application."

In order to win the stay of deportation, Manning had to show that her client would suffer "irreparable harm," if returned to the United States as noted in Justice Mosley's quote above. Manning also argued that this legal criterion of "irreparable harm" were met in another way: the permanent loss of voting privileges in the country of one's residence (which accompanies the felony of desertion in the US) also constitutes "irreparable harm," Manning argued.

==== Humanitarian and compassionate grounds ====
On 10 February 2009, Federal Court Justice James Russell heard the appeal of the decision in the Hinzman family's "humanitarian and compassionate grounds" (H&C) application (not an appeal of their refugee claim). On April 24 that year, the judge upheld the negative decision in the Hinzmans' application. (His judgment was officially issued June 2.)

However, this was appealed to the Canadian Federal Court of Appeal on 25 May 2010.

On 6 July 2010, the Court of Appeal ruled unanimously that a Canadian immigration official (S. Parr) decision (22 July 2008), and also the lower court's upholding of that decision (2 June 2009), both failed to consider the "hardships" of Hinzman. The court said the rejection of Hinzman's permanent residence application was "significantly flawed" because the officer did not take into consideration Hinzman's "strong moral and religious beliefs" against participation in the war. That means officials must take another look at Hinzman's application to remain in Canada on humanitarian and compassionate grounds.

Hinzman's lawyer, Alyssa Manning, said, that his "officer missed the point and only considered refugee-type questions." Refugee cases typically only consider risk to life or risk of persecution. "An H&C [officer] is supposed to consider humanitarian and compassionate values — the questions inherent with an H&C application," Manning said. "Hinzman's beliefs, his whole reasons for being in Canada in the first place, weren't considered by the H&C officer, and that's what was significantly flawed about [the officer's] decision."

Hinzman's case will now go back for another hearing before a different immigration officer. Michelle Robidoux, a spokeswoman with the War Resisters Support Campaign, said the appellate ruling is important for other war resisters in Canada as well.

== In popular culture ==
A live theater production entitled, The Hearing of Jeremy Hinzman was staged in August 2012, in Toronto, as part of the annual Summerworks Theatre Festival. It was written by Josh Bloch and Oonagh Duncan, produced by Foundry Theatre Company, and directed by Richard Greenblatt. According to Toronto's Now Magazine, the drama was based "on the real-life case of an Iraq War deserter who was put on trial in 2004 to determine his status as a refugee in Canada, this example of verbatim theatre debates the legality of the 2003 U.S. invasion, and the rights of individual soldiers to think for themselves."

Peace Has No Borders is a 2016 feature-length documentary about Iraq and Afghan War resisters from the U.S. seeking refuge in Canada, directed by Deb Ellis and Denis Mueller.
