= Anne Mactavish =

Canadian judge

Anne L. Mactavish

Judge of the Federal Court of Appeal
- Incumbent
- Assumed office June 22, 2019
- Nominated by: Jean Chrétien

Judge of the Federal Court
- In office November 19, 2003 – June 22, 2019

Personal details
- Born: Montreal, Quebec, Canada
- Education: Bishop's University, University of New Brunswick, University of Ottawa

Anne L. Mactavish is a Canadian jurist who is a judge of the Federal Court of Appeal.

== Early life and education ==
Born in Montreal, Quebec, Canada, Mactavish was educated at Bishop's University, the University of New Brunswick, and the University of Ottawa. She was called to the Bar of Ontario in 1982. She became an Associate and Partner at Perley-Robertson, Panet, Hill & McDougall from 1982 to 1996. She was appointed President of the Human Rights Tribunal Panel in 1995, and Chairperson of the Canadian Human Rights Tribunal in 1998. (The rules stipulate that the Chairperson of the Canadian Human Rights Tribunal be appointed for a term of not more than seven years.) Mactavish was also President of the County of Carleton Law Association.

As of January 2009, she was President of the Canadian Institute for the Administration of Justice.

Mactavish was appointed a judge of the Federal Court and a member ex officio of the Federal Court of Appeal on November 19, 2003. She was appointed as a judge of the Court Martial Appeal Court of Canada on March 23, 2004.

Mactavish was elevated to the Court of Appeal on June 22, 2019.

== Rulings regarding Iraq war resister cases ==
Justice Mactavish heard two well publicized cases involving Iraq War Resisters: those of Jeremy Hinzman and Robin Long. Mactavish ruled against Jeremy Hinzman's application for refugee status on March 31, 2006, something that generated significant press coverage. In the later similar case of Robin Long on July 14, 2008, "Madam Justice Anne Mactavish of the Federal Court of Canada cleared the way for [Long's] deportation ..." Robin Long was the first U.S. soldier to be deported from Canada to the United States.

== See also ==
- Mactavish ruling on Jeremy Hinzman in the context of Canada and Iraq War Resisters
- Federal Court
- Jeremy Hinzman
- Robin Long
