= Brian P. Goodman =

Canadian lawyer and civil servant (1947-2013)

Brian Paul Goodman (June 2, 1947, Toronto, Ontario, Canada – June 18, 2013, Boca Raton, Florida) was the Chairperson of the Immigration and Refugee Board of Canada (IRB).

== History ==
He trained in law at Osgoode Hall Law School, paying his own way through summer jobs. He was called to the Ontario Bar in 1974. He held a master's degree in Public Law. In 1983, he joined the Ontario Civil Service. In May 1998, he was appointed to the position of Executive Lead, Agency Reform for Ontario's Ministry of the Attorney General.

In 2001, Goodman was appointed a member of the Immigration and Refugee Board of Canada, and assigned to the Convention Refugee Determination Division in Toronto. In 2003, he was reappointed to that position.

While a member of the Immigration and Refugee Board, he heard the case of Jeremy Hinzman, a U.S. soldier seeking refugee status in Canada after his refusal to participate in the Iraq War.

In 2007, Goodman was appointed as chairperson of the Immigration and Refugee Board of Canada. His appointment was initially for four years.

== Death ==
Goodman died suddenly of a cardiac arrhythmia in Boca Raton, Florida on June 18, 2013, aged 66. He was survived by his second wife, Dale Mileris Goodman, their four children (Rachel, Sarah, Daniel, and Patricia), three siblings (Jeff, Stuart and Andy), and a grandson.

Goodman was remembered by Immigration Minister Jason Kenney as having led a number of reforms in relation to refugee determination at the Board, including the establishment of a new Refugee Protection Division and a Refugee Appeal Division.
