= Immigration and Refugee Board of Canada =

Canadian tribunal

- La Commission de l'immigration et du statut de réfugié du Canada

Agency overview
- Formed: 1989
- Type: Independent administrative tribunal
- Minister responsible: Lena Diab, Minister of Immigration, Refugees and Citizenship
- Agency executives: • Manon Brassard, chairperson; • Roger Ermuth, executive director and chief financial officer; • Roula Eatrides, deputy chairperson (Refugee Protection Division); • Greg Kipling, deputy chairperson (Immigration Division); • Suzanne Gilbert, deputy chairperson (Immigration Appeal Division); • Paula Thompson, deputy chairperson (Refugee Appeal Division); • Julie Wellington, Senior General Counsel; • Raymond Kunze, Ombudsperson
- Parent department: N/A (Reports to parliament through the Minister of Citizenship and Immigration, but remains independent)
- Key document: Immigration and Refugee Protection Act
- Website: irb-cisr.gc.ca

The Immigration and Refugee Board of Canada (or IRB; French: La Commission de l'immigration et du statut de réfugié du Canada, CISR), established in 1989 by an Act of Parliament, is an independent administrative tribunal that is responsible for making decisions on immigration and refugee matters. As one of their responsibilities, the IRB decides on applications for refugee protection made by individuals. The IRB reports to Parliament through the Minister of Immigration, Refugees and Citizenship (IRCC), but remains independent from both the IRCC and the Minister.

== Governance ==
=== Governing documents ===
Matters concerning the IRB are governed under the Immigration and Refugee Protection Act (IRPA). In addition, IRB follows Canada's "Immigration and Refugee Protection Regulations", the "Immigration Division Rules", the "Immigration Appeals Division Rules", and the "Refugee Protection Division Rules".

=== Chairperson ===
The chairperson of the IRB is Manon Brassard, who was appointed to the position 23 July 2023. Past chairs include:

- Richard Wex (2018-2023)
- Mario Dion (2013–2018)
- Brian Goodman (2007–2013)
- Jean-Guy Fleury (2002–2007)
- Peter Showler (1999–2002)
- Nurjehan Mawani (1992–1999)
- Gordon Fairweather (1989–1992)

== Divisions of the board ==
The IRB consists of four divisions:

1. Immigration
2. Immigration Appeals
3. Refugee Protection
4. Refugee Appeals.

=== Immigration and Immigration Appeals Divisions ===
The Immigration Division (ID) consists of two main functions: to conduct admissibility hearings and to conduct detention reviews. If the Canada Border Services Agency (CBSA) believes an individual has not followed or contravenes IRPA, they will ask the IRB to conduct an admissibility hearing—which will determine if the individual remain or enter Canada. If an individual is detained or held for immigration purposes, the Immigration Division will conduct detention reviews, which are done within certain time frames, set forth by IRPA. A member of the Division, or of the CBSA, will determine if an individual shall be released from detention.

The Immigration Appeals Division (IAD) hears appeals of immigration matters. These immigration matters are related to: sponsorships, removal orders, residency obligations or appeals made by (on behalf of) the Minister.

=== Refugee Protection and Refugee Appeals Divisions ===
The Refugee Protection Division (RPD) makes determinations for individuals in Canada seeking protection. For individuals residing outside of Canada, Immigration, Refugees and Citizenship Canada (IRCC) makes the decision.

The Refugee Appeals Division (RAD) hears appeals of refugee matters, in accordance to the conventions of the United Nations that Canada is a signatory of:

- Convention Relating to the Status of Refugees (1951)
- Protocol Relating to the Status of Refugees (1967)
- Convention Against Torture and Other Cruel, Inhuman and Degrading Treatment or Punishment (1984)

A claim for refugee protection can be made inland (IRCC or CBSA office) or at a port of entry (airport, border crossing). The IRB will grant protection to an individual who is a convention refugee or a person in need of protection. A convention refugee is an individual who has a well-founded fear of persecution in their home country based on race, religion, nationality, political opinion, or membership in a particular social group.

==== Eligibility ====
A claim is not eligible if an individual

1. has already been granted refugee protection in Canada or another country;
2. has previously been refused refugee protection in Canada;
3. has previously made a claim in a country that has an information sharing agreement with Canada for the purposes of administering it's immigration and citizenship laws;
4. has come to Canada from/through a designated safe third country in which a claim for protection was sought;
5. has committed a crime against peace, war crime or crime against humanity, a serious non-political crime outside the country of refuge, or acts contrary to the purposes and principles of the United Nations.

== See also ==
- Immigration to Canada
- Immigration, Refugees and Citizenship Canada
- Canada Border Services Agency
- Immigration and Refugee Protection Act
