= German military law =

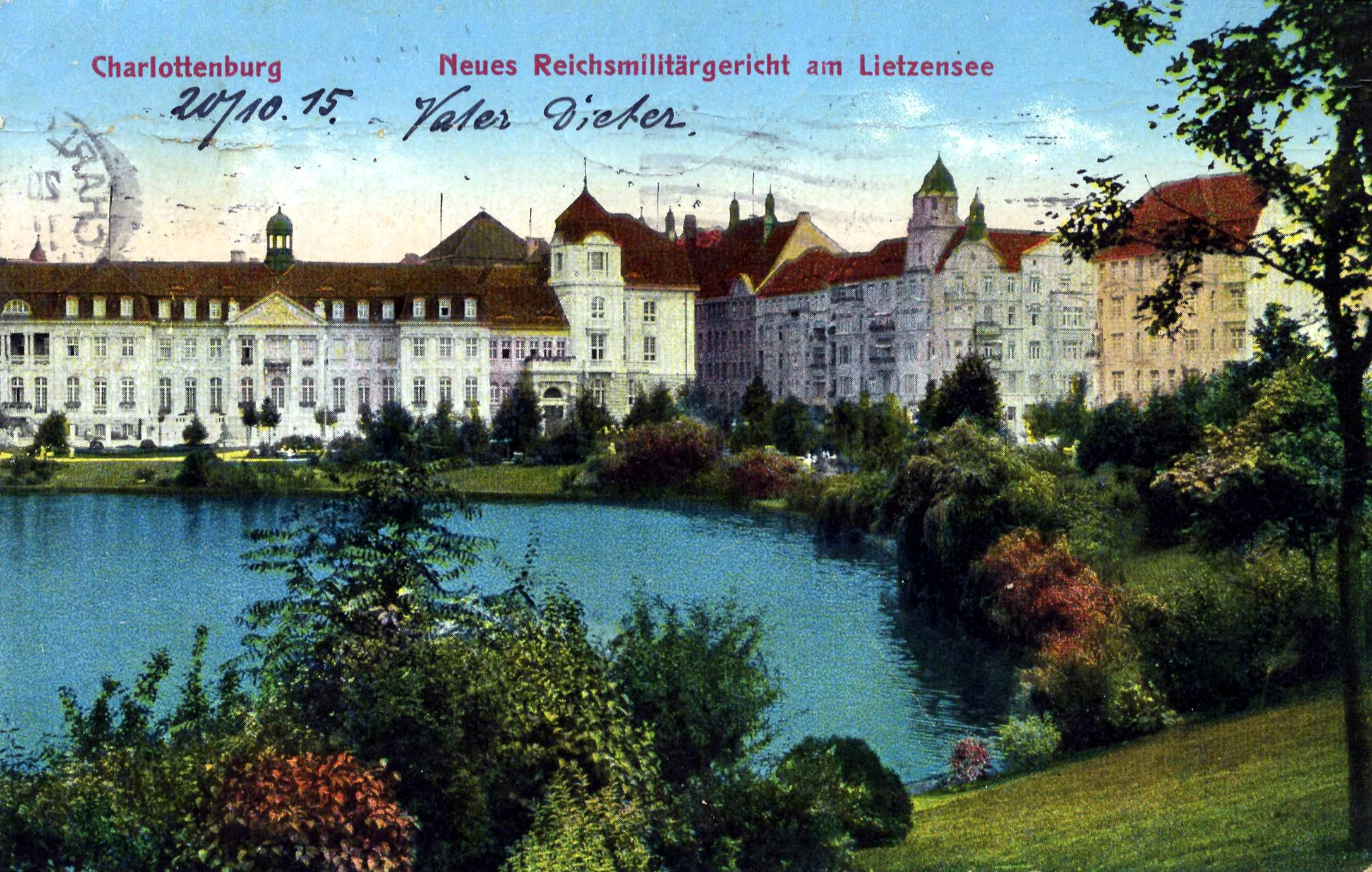
Reichsmilitärgericht (left) in Charlottenburg, c. 1915

German military law has a long history.

== Early history ==
Drumhead courts-martial in the German lands had existed since the Early modern period.

The trial of Peter von Hagenbach by an ad hoc tribunal of the Holy Roman Empire in 1474 was the first "international" recognition of commanders' obligations to act lawfully. Hagenbach was put on trial for atrocities committed during the Burgundian Wars against the civilians of Breisach. Standing accused of allowing his troops to commit mass murder and war rape, which, "he as a knight was deemed to have a duty to prevent", and of personally committing perjury, Hagenbach replied that he could not be held criminally responsible because he only followed orders from the Duke of Burgundy, Charles the Bold, against whose rule the city of Breisach had rebelled. The court, however, rejected the superior orders defence. Peter von Hagenbach was found guilty of war crimes and executed by beheading at Breisach on 4 May 1474. Despite the fact there was no explicit use of the term command responsibility, the trial of Peter von Hagenbach is seen as the first war crimes prosecution based on this principle.

During the Thirty Years' War several Imperial states established military tribunals modelled on the jurisdiction of the Swedish Army. In Brandenburg-Prussia, justice was dispensed by special Auditeur attorneys through three official channels.

== German Empire ==
After the Prussian-led Unification of Germany, the German Empire with effect from 1 October 1900 established a particular court-martial jurisdiction (German: Militärgerichtsbarkeit) to try soldiers of the German Army, with the Reichsmilitärgericht (RMG) in Charlottenburg as the supreme court. In Prussia it replaced the Generalauditoriat agency, while the Kingdom of Bavaria retained the right to pass judgements to members of the Bavarian Army by a separate (the 3rd) senate. The presiding judge in the rank of a general or admiral was appointed directly by the German Emperor.

During World War I, Imperial German military courts routinely tried both their own soldiers, POWs, and civilians, who were alleged to have knowingly violated German military law. Whenever the evidence gave them credibility, defense arguments of both superior orders and also, in contradiction of the Roman legal principle of Ignorantia juris non excusat, ignorance of the law were often taken very seriously by German military courts in the German Empire, and were sometimes considered grounds for granting leniency.

The Prussian Ministry of War also founded a Bureau to investigate allegations of both Allied and German war crimes, including alleged Franc-Tireur activity by Belgian civilians, 157 alleged massacres of German POWs by the French Army on the Western Front, and the Baralong Incidents and other alleged British war crimes on both land and at sea.

Following complaints by the British Foreign Office, Imperial German Army Sergeant Karl Heynen, was court martialed for allegedly using unnecessary brutality against 200 British and 40 Russian POWs, who were under his command as forced labourers at the Friedrich der Grosse coal mine at Herne, in Westphalia. Sgt. Heynen stood accused of regularly using corporal punishment, including his fists and rifle butt and was also tried for having allegedly driven a British POW named Cross insane through various cruelties, including throwing the POW into a shower bath with alternating hot and cold water, for half an hour. It was further alleged that, after a British POW named MacDonald had escaped and been recaptured, that Heynen had hit MacDonald with his rifle butt, knocked him down and kicked him. Also, on October 14, 1915, Heynen stood accused of having threatened the POWs under his command with summary execution if they did not immediately return to work during an attempted strike action. Sgt. Heynen was court-martialed, found guilty, and sentenced to fourteen days' "detention in a fortress", with suspended sentence until after the end of the war. Heynen was reassigned to active service at the Front and subsequently awarded the Iron Cross for courage under enemy fire. At the insistence of the British Government after the Armistice, however, double jeopardy was set aside and Sgt. Heynen was retried at the Leipzig war crimes trials for the same offences.

Of those enemy nationals who were prosecuted, especially well-known is the case of Edith Cavell, a British Intelligence operative under International Red Cross cover, who was court-martialled and sentenced to death in Occupied Belgium for, among many other things, helping an estimated 200 escaped British POW's to cross the lines and return to active service – which in wartime was indeed a death penalty offence for civilians under the German military law in the German Empire. Cavell was also convicted of perfidy, for having used the international legal protection given by her position as a Red Cross nurse as a cover for violating medical neutrality during wartime. Cavell was executed by firing squad in Brussels on October 12, 1915.

Belgian national Gabrielle Petit, a fellow British Intelligence field agent for La Dame Blanche spy ring in occupied Belgium, was similarly court-martialed as a civilian subject to service discipline, convicted of espionage, and executed by firing squad on 1 April 1916.

After his civilian merchant ship was captured off German-occupied Belgium, English captain Charles Fryatt was court-martialled by the German Imperial Navy for "illegal civilian warfare", "being a Franc-Tireur", and attempting to ram and sink SM U-33 on 28 March, 1915. The trial, verdict, and death sentence were also covert retaliation for Winston Churchill's orders to both the Royal Navy and British merchant seaman to unleash total war against U-boat crews, which had already resulted in one of the most infamous British war crimes of the Great War, which also led directly to the German Admiralty's decision to adopt unrestricted submarine warfare: the 19 August 1915 massacre by the Royal Navy of the shipwrecked crew of SM U-27 in the Baralong incidents. Charles Fryatt was executed by a Naval firing squad in Bruges on 27 July 1916.

== Nazi Germany ==
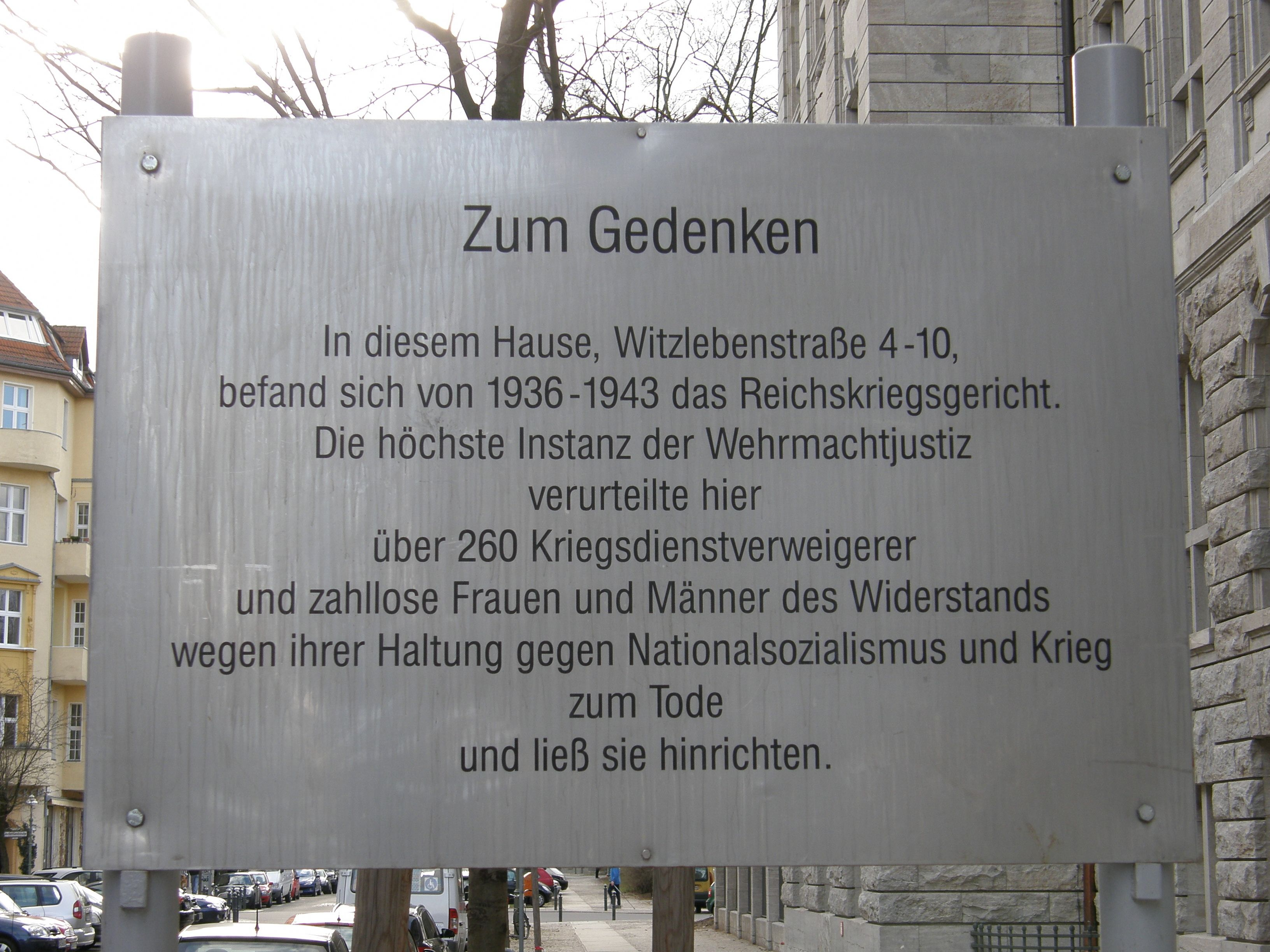
Memorial plaque in front of the former Reichskriegsgericht building

After World War I, the Weimar Republic (1919-1933), abolished separate courts-martial by Article 106 of the Weimar Constitution, but they were revived by the Nazi German government after it had seized power during the Machtergreifung and enacted a special law on 12 May 1933. Initially the Reichsgericht in Leipzig, from 1 December 1934 the "People's Court" (Volksgerichtshof) in Berlin, acted as final appellate court until the Reichskriegsgericht (RKG) was established as high court of the Wehrmacht armed forces by another directive with effect from 1 October 1936. The Reichskriegsgericht was based in the former RMG building on Witzlebenstraße in the Charlottenburg district of Berlin.

A directive on a special criminal law of war was already enacted on 17 August 1938 by OKW chief Wilhelm Keitel at the behest of Führer Adolf Hitler. From the beginning of World War II, the court convicted not only Wehrmacht members but also prisoners-of-war and civilians in the area of operations. The Reichskriegsgericht acted as the first and last resort for 44 criminal offenses under penalty of death such as the following:

- High treason (Hochverrat),
- State treason (Landesverrat), primarily espionage
- War treason (Kriegsverrat), a diffuse term applied to all kind of actions that weaken the military strength of Germany and her allies, like perfidy, espionage, "conveying soldiers to the enemy", etc.
- Subversion of military strength (Wehrkraftzersetzung), which encompassed even critical statements
- Conscientious objection (Kriegsdienstverweigerung) and desertion (Fahnenflucht).

With the arms buildup and continued warfare, the number of Wehrmacht courts-martial increased to over 1,000. On 13 May 1941 Hitler had Keitel pass a directive, according to which any Wehrmacht officer had the authority to execute accused civilians in the area of Operation Barbarossa and the Eastern Front without trial. Against the laws of war, the official repeal of criminal prosecution led to widespread hostage-taking, mass executions, burning and looting by German forces.

At the same time, according to historian Alfred Maurice de Zayas, senior Wehrmacht commanders with more traditional views of service honour insisted upon court martial prosecutions of German soldiers who stood accused of crimes against civilians in occupied countries or for massacres or other mistreatment of POWs. In fact, there are numerous documented cases of court martial convictions and even executions by hanging or firing squad in such cases. Furthermore, several senior officials of the legal departments of the German armed forces became involved in the German resistance to Nazism. Several military lawyers and judges, including Karl Sack, Rudolf Schleicher, and Helmuth James von Moltke, were executed by following the failure of the July 20th Plot against the life of Adolf Hitler.

On March 8, 1945, Chancellor Adolf Hitler authorized the use of Fliegendes Sonder-Standgericht (Flying Courts-Martial) to try German armed forces in the field. The use of "flying" refers to their mobility and may also refer to the earlier "flying courts martial" held in Italian Libya. Italian military judges were flown by aircraft to the location of captured rebels where the rebels were tried in a court martial shortly after capture.

Between 1939 and 1945 the Reichskriegsgericht in Berlin was responsible for over 1,400 executions including those by the Red Orchestra. In 1943 the court was transferred to Torgau, where it was based until the end of the war. In 1951 the building became the temporarily base of the Berlin Kammergericht (appellate court), since 2005 it is a private estate.

After the German Instrument of Surrender, Nazi courts martial were not abolished by the Allied Control Council until 20 August 1946. In 2002 and 2009 the German Bundestag parliament finally passed bills to suspend the verdicts against Wehrmacht for desertion and homosexual activity as well as against "war traitors".

== Legacy ==
Since 1949, the Federal Republic of Germany has no special military courts. Criminal acts committed by soldiers are tried in ordinary criminal courts by civilian judges.

Article 96 paragraph 2 of German Basic Law (Grundgesetz) allows the government to create specialised military courts in case of war and for soldiers sent abroad, subject to a federal law. Such a law has not been passed.

Smaller offences are being handled by disciplinary courts which are attached to the administrative court system. They may only pronounce disciplinary punishments, but no criminal sentences (e.g. no imprisonment, except 21 days of detention in the watch room).

== Commemorative plaques ==
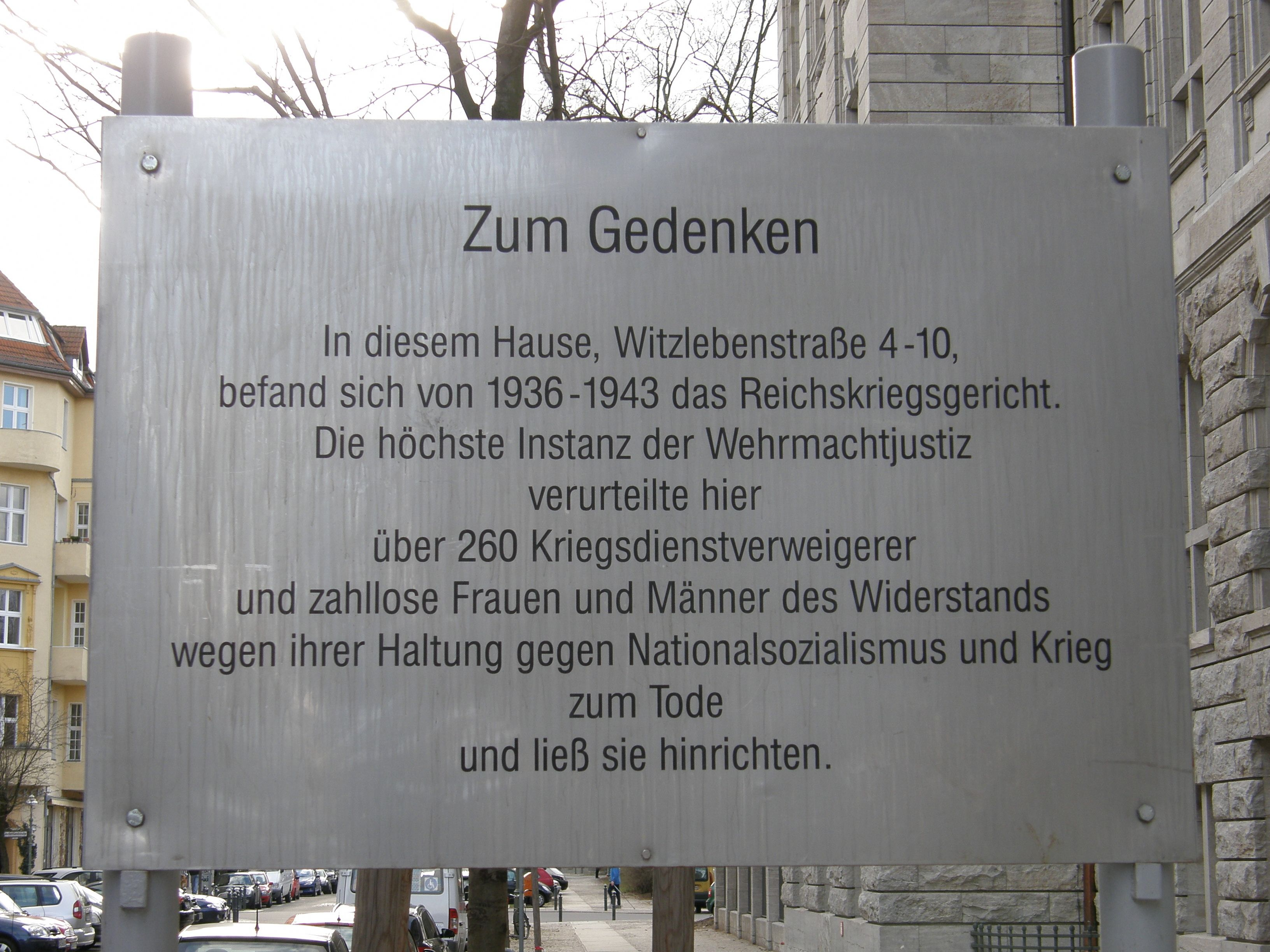
Plaque to conscientious objectors and resistance fighters at the former Reichskriegsgericht in Berlin

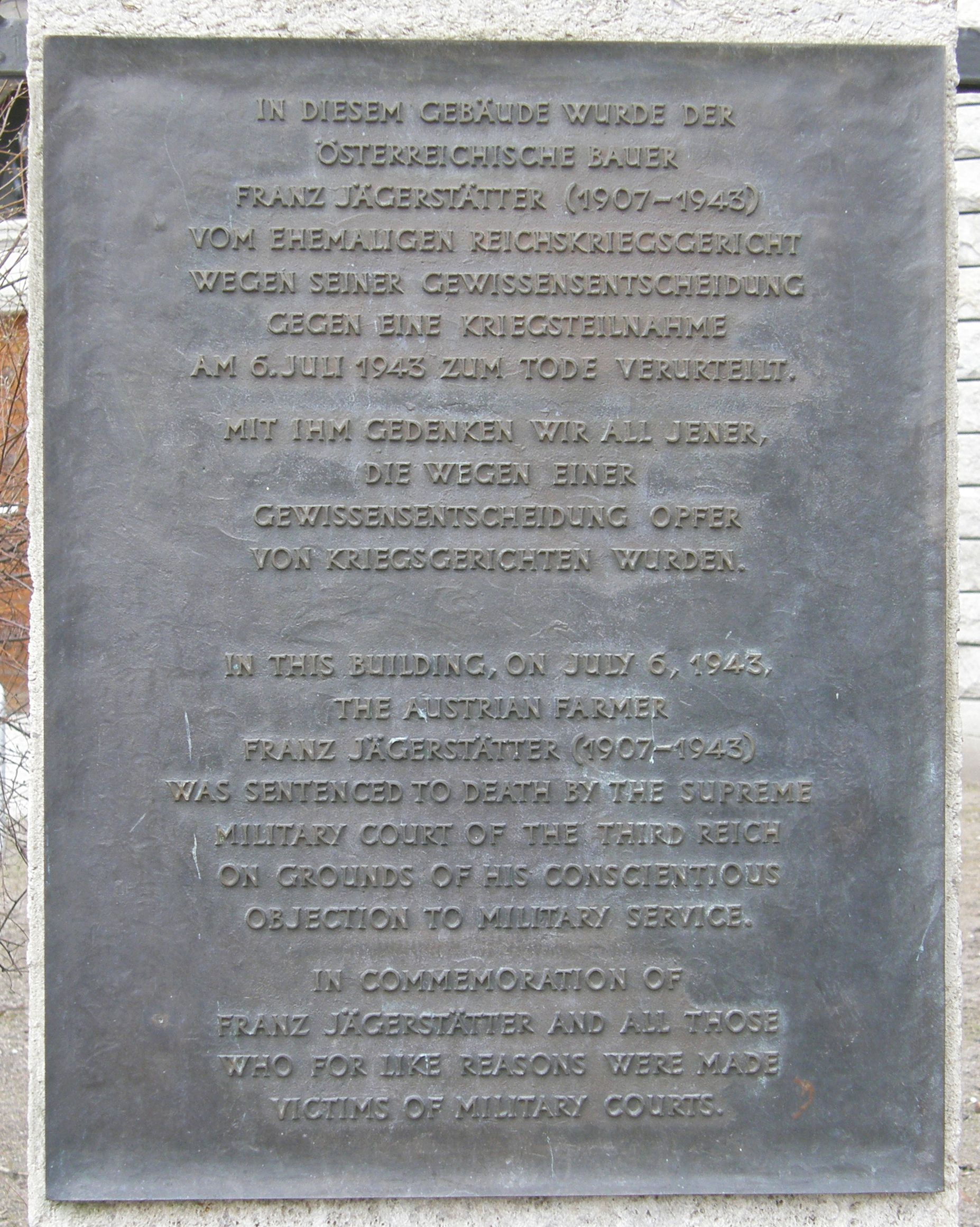
Plaque to Franz Jägerstätter at the former Reichskriegsgericht in Berlin

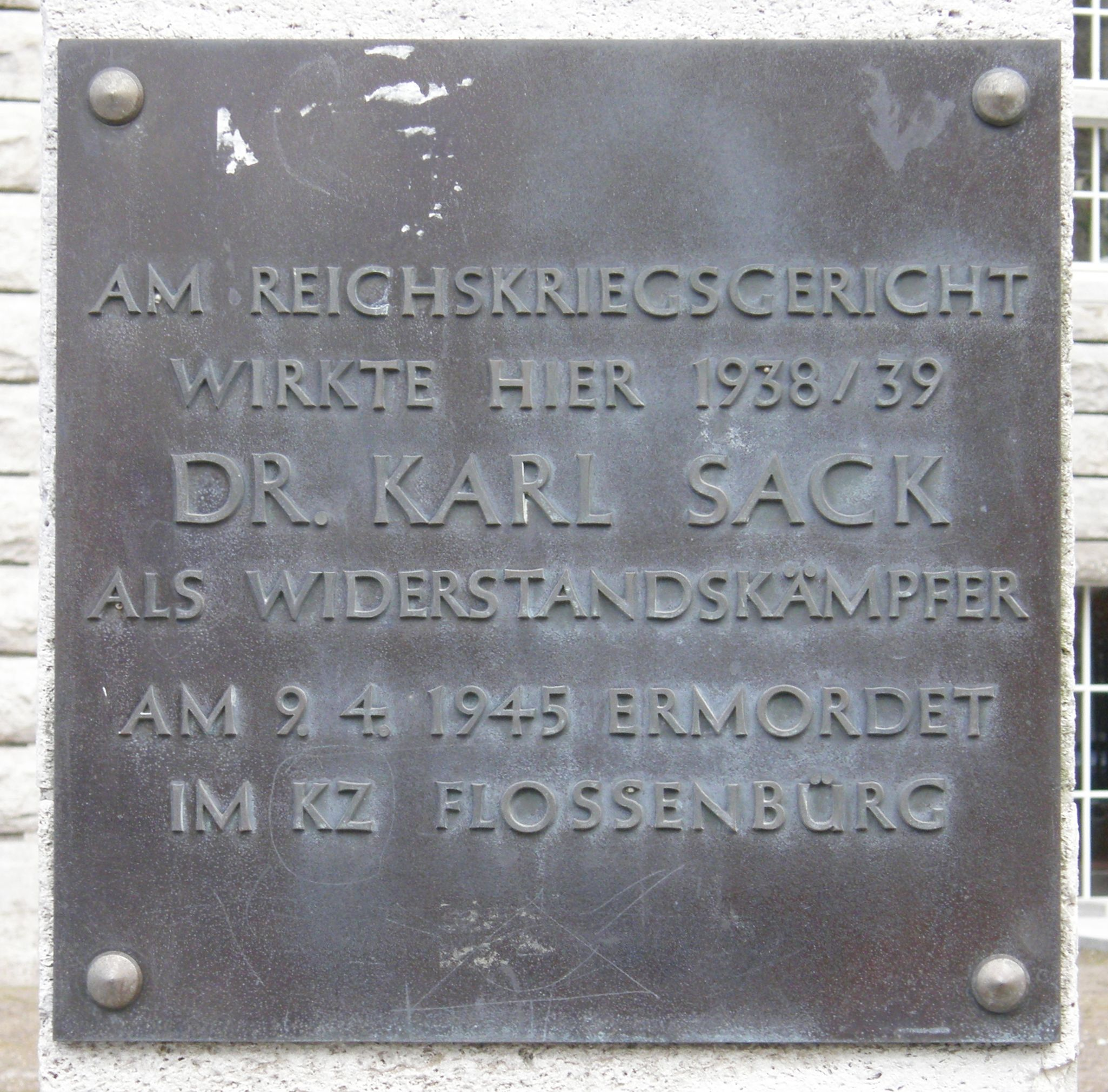
Plaque to Karl Sack at the former Reichskriegsgericht in Berlin

== See also ==
- War crimes of the Wehrmacht
- Military law
- Court martial
- Command and obedience in the Bundeswehr
- Franz Jägerstätter
- Karl Sack
