= Periodic Report of the United States of America to the United Nations Committee Against Torture =

The Periodic Report of the United States of America to the United Nations Committee Against Torture is periodically submitted by the United States government, through the State Department, to the United Nations Committee Against Torture. In October 2005, the report focused on the detention of suspects in the war on terror, including those held in Guantánamo Bay. This particular Periodic Report is significant as the first official response of the U.S. government to allegations that prisoners are mistreated in Guantánamo Bay and in Afghanistan. The report denies those allegations. The report does not address detainees held by the Central Intelligence Agency.

The original text for the report is available:

- State Department original documents pertaining to Reports to U.N. on Second Periodic Report of the United States of America to the Committee Against Torture, and Third Periodic Report.
- Update to Annex One of the Second Periodic Report October 21, 2005
- A 2017 report in UN archives, and other reports.

== See also ==
- Criticism of the war on terror
- Enemy combatant and Unlawful combatant
- Enhanced interrogation techniques
- Extraordinary rendition
- Torture
- War Crimes Act of 1996
