= Parental responsibility =

Parental responsibility may refer to

- The duties involved in human parenting
- Parental responsibility (access and custody), in the European Union, refers to the bundle of rights and privileges that children have with their parents and significant others as the basis of their relationship
- Parental responsibility (criminal), in Canada and the United States, refers to the potential liability that parents may incur for the acts and omissions of their children

== See also ==
- Legal guardian
- Parent
