= Leipzig trial =

Leipzig trial may refer to:

- Leipzig war crimes trials, held in Leipzig after World War I
- The trial of alleged perpetrators of the Reichstag fire, held in Leipzig in 1933
