= United States v. Keenan =

American court case

United States v. Keenan was a court case in the United States where the accused, US Marine PFC Charles W. Keenan, was found guilty of murder after he shot and killed a Vietnamese man under orders from a superior officer during the Vietnam War. The Court of Military Appeals held that following orders was not a justification if "the order was of such a nature that a man of ordinary sense and understanding would know it to be illegal". The Marine who gave Keenan the order, US Marine Corporal Stanley Luczko, was convicted of killing another Vietnamese person during the same incident. The case gained renewed attention in 2025 as part of a controversy over the issue of following unlawful orders.

== See also ==
- Superior orders – Criminal defense of following the orders of a superior
- My Lai massacre
