= Emil Müller (German officer) =

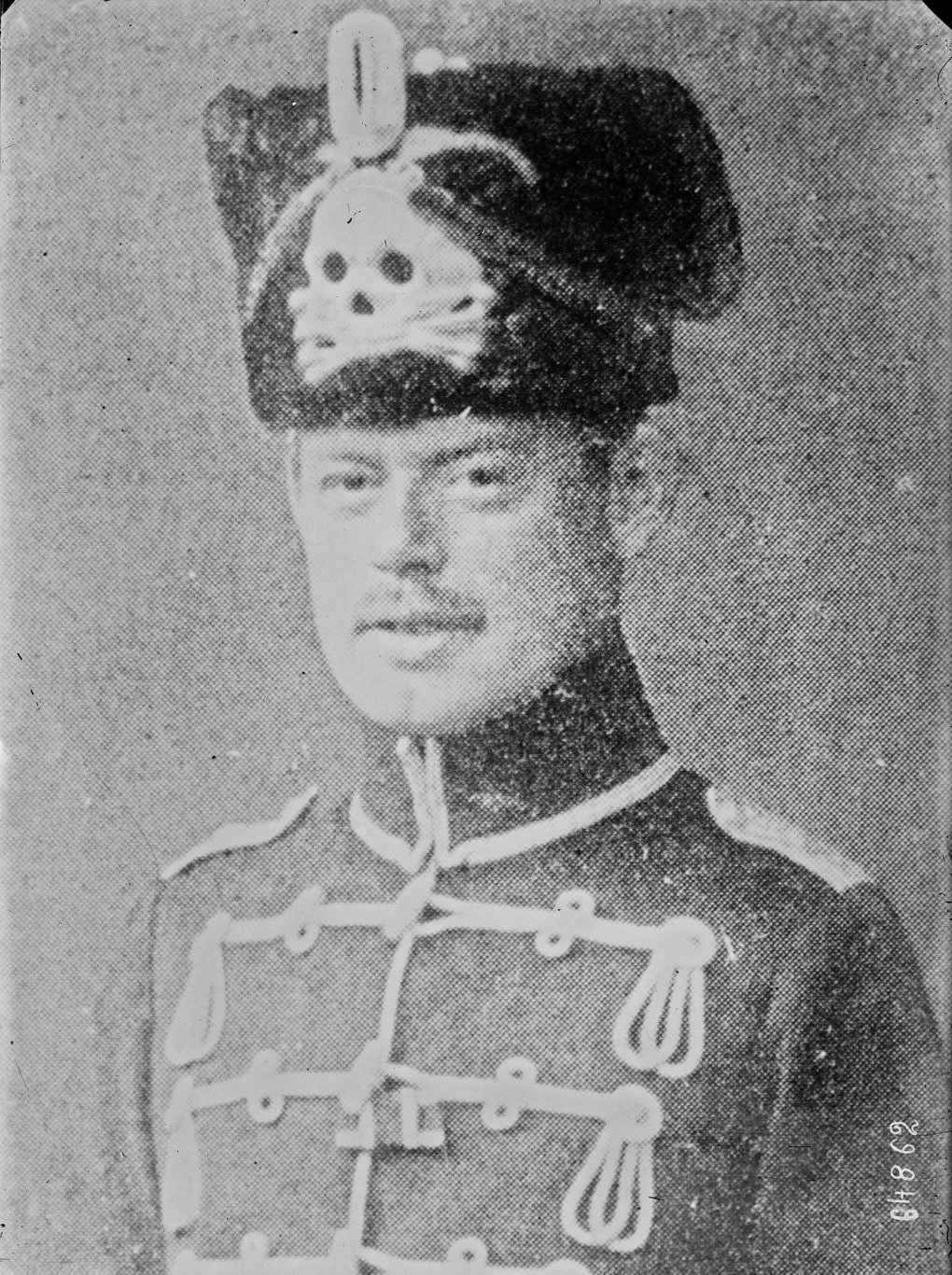
Emil Müller in uniform of Prussian totenkopf hussar

Emil Müller was a Captain in the Imperial German Army who was convicted and sentenced at the Leipzig war crimes trials in 1921.

Müller was born in Karlsruhe, German Empire and worked as a barrister before joining the army. He was appointed head of the Flavy de Martel prisoner of war camp where approximately 1000 prisoners were held. Charges leveled against him after the end of the First World War included the failure to maintain a decent condition of the camp which led to 500 deaths as a result of dysentery, failure to prevent the commission of crimes and to punish the perpetrators thereof and, as well as physical violence directed towards prisoners. He was sentenced to six months in a civilian prison. The term "command responsibility" was first applied in the trial of Müller.
