= Command responsibility =

Doctrine of hierarchical accountability

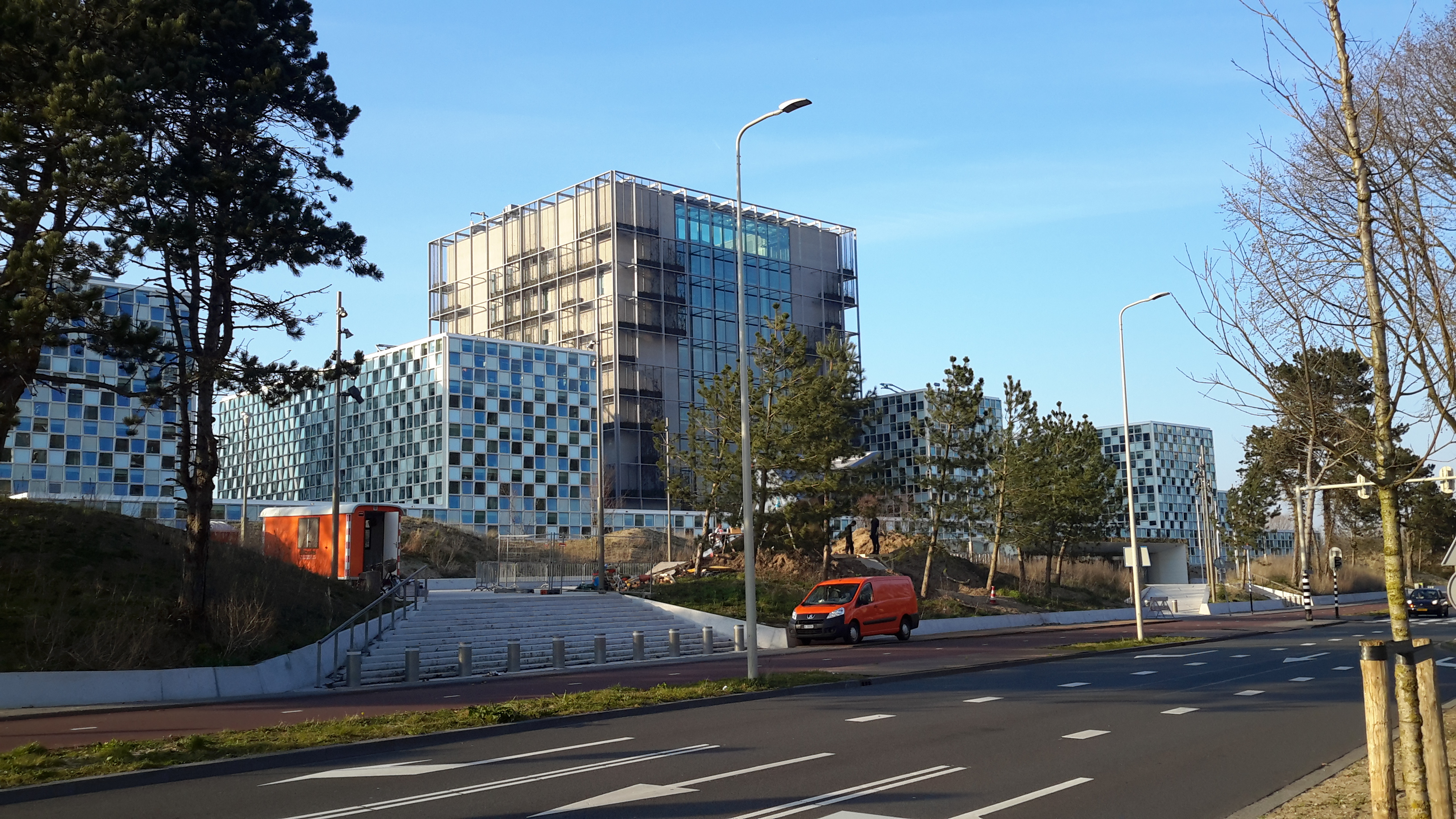
Command responsibility: the war criminals of the world are tried, judged, and sentenced by the International Criminal Court at The Hague, Netherlands.

In the practice of international law, command responsibility (also superior responsibility) is the legal doctrine of hierarchical accountability for war crimes, whereby a commanding officer (military) and a superior officer (civil) are legally responsible for the war crimes and the crimes against humanity committed by their subordinates; thus, a commanding officer always is accountable for the acts of commission and the acts of omission of their soldiers.

In the late 19th century, the legal doctrine of command responsibility was codified in the Hague Conventions of 1899 and 1907, which are partly based upon the Lieber Code (General Orders No. 100, 24 April 1863), military law that legally allowed the Union Army to fight in the regular and the irregular modes of warfare deployed by the Confederacy during the American Civil War (1861–1865). As international law, the legal doctrine and the term command responsibility were applied and used in the Leipzig war crimes trials (1921) that included the trial of Captain Emil Müller for prisoner abuse committed by his soldiers during the First World War (1914–1918).

In the 20th century, in the late 1940s, the Yamashita standard derived from the incorporation into the U.S. Code of the developments of the legal doctrine of command responsibility presented in the Nuremberg trials (1945–1946). Abiding by that legal precedent, the U.S. Supreme Court allowed the U.S. prosecution of the war crimes case against Imperial Japanese Army General Tomoyuki Yamashita for the atrocities committed by his soldiers in the Philippine Islands, in the Pacific Theatre (1941–1945) of the Second World War. The Manila Military Tribunal charged, tried, and judged Gen. Yamashita for "unlawfully disregarding, and failing to discharge, his duty as a commander to control the acts of members of his command, by permitting them to commit war crimes".

In the 20th century, in the early 1970s, the Medina standard expanded the U.S. Code to include the criminal liability of American military officers for the war crimes committed by their subordinates, as are the war-criminal military officers of an enemy power. The Medina standard was established in the court martial of U.S. Army Captain Ernest Medina in 1971 for not exercising his command authority as a company commander, by not acting to halt the My Lai massacre (16 March 1968) committed by his soldiers during the Vietnam War (1955–1975).

== Historical development ==
=== 9th-century BC to 5th-century BC Asia ===
In The Art of War (5th century BC), Sun Tzu said that the duties and responsibilities of a commanding officer were to ensure that in prosecuting a war, his soldiers act in accordance with the customary laws of war, by limiting their operational actions to the military aims of the war.

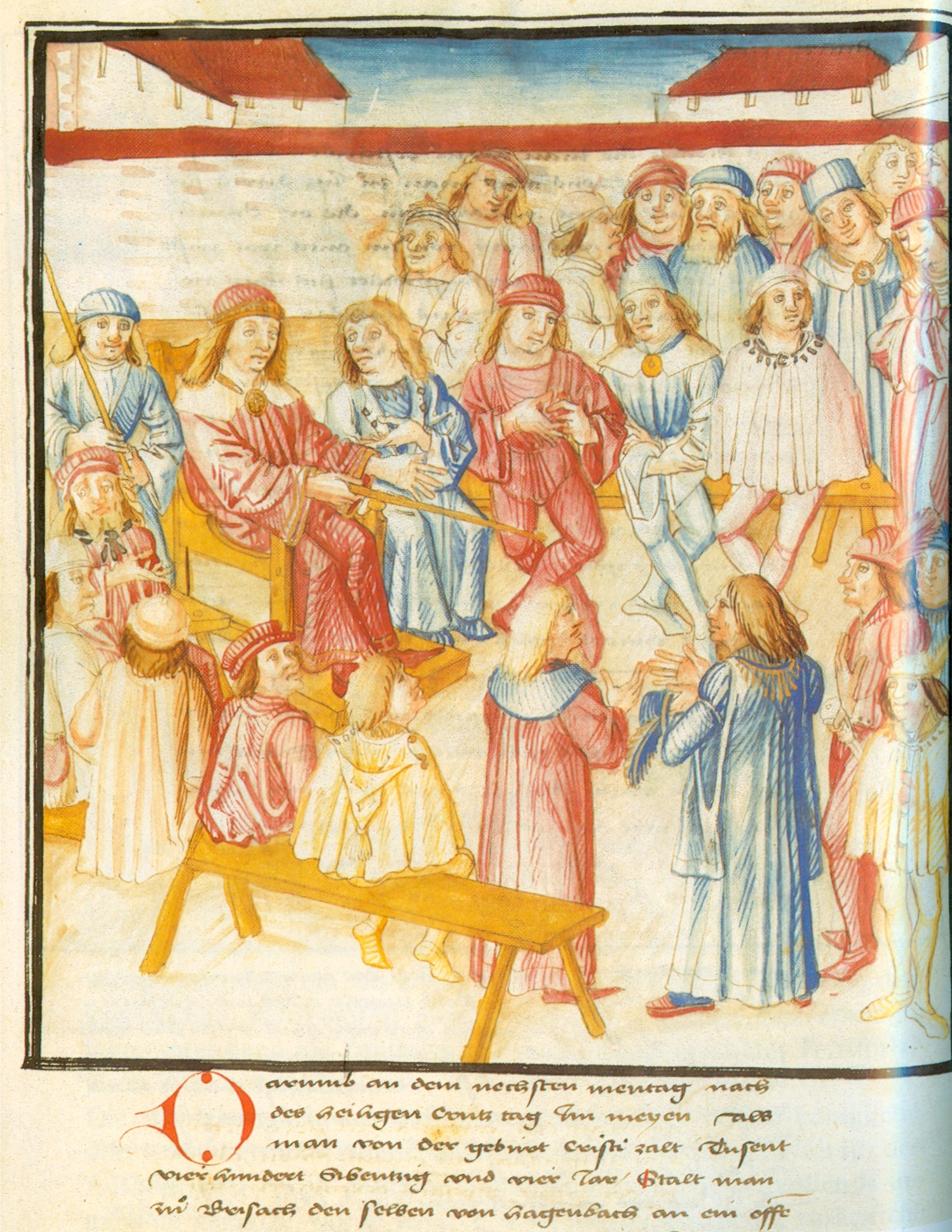
Command responsibility: The war-crimes trial of the Knight Hagenbach. (Berner Chronik des Diebold Schilling dem Älteren).

=== 15th-century Europe ===
In 1474, in the Holy Roman Empire (962–1806), the trial of the Burgundian knight Peter von Hagenbach was the first international recognition of the legal doctrine of command responsibility, of a commander's legal obligation to ensure that his soldiers act in accordance with customary law in prosecuting their war. The tribunal tried Hagenbach for atrocities committed by his soldiers during their military occupation of Breisach, and was found guilty of their war crimes, condemned to death, and then was beheaded.

The Knight Hagenbach was accused of, tried, and convicted for war crimes that "he, as a knight, was deemed to have [had] a duty to prevent"; in self-defense, Hagenbach argued that he was only following the military orders of Charles the Bold, the Duke of Burgundy, to whom the Holy Roman Empire had bequeathed Breisach. Although the term command responsibility did not exist in the 15th century, the tribunal did presume he had a legal responsibility for war crimes of his soldiers, thus Hagenbach's trial was the first war crimes trial based upon the legal doctrine of command responsibility.

=== 19th-century United States ===
During the American Civil War (1861–1865), the legal doctrine of command responsibility was codified in the Lieber Code – General Orders No. 100: Instructions for the Government of Armies of the United States in the Field (24 April 1863) – the contemporary updating of the 18th-century military law of the 1806 Articles of War that allowed the Union Army to lawfully combat the regular and irregular modes of warfare (partisans, guerrillas, spies) deployed by the Confederacy in the mid-19th century.

As U.S. military law, the Lieber Code stipulated a commander's legal responsibility for the war crimes and crimes against humanity committed by his subordinate officers, sergeants, and soldiers; and further stipulated the duties and rights of the individual soldier of the Union Army to not commit war crimes – such as the summary execution of Confederate POWs, irregular combatants, and enemy civilians; thus Article 71, Section III of the Lieber Code stipulates that:

Whoever intentionally inflicts additional wounds on an enemy already wholly disabled, or kills such an enemy, or who orders or encourages soldiers to do so, shall suffer death, if duly convicted, whether he belongs to the Army of the United States, or is an enemy captured after having committed his misdeed.

=== 20th century ===
The Hague Conventions of 1899 and 1907 are the international legal foundations for the conduct of war among civilized nations, especially the legal doctrine of command responsibility for war crimes and crimes against humanity. The Hague Convention of 1907 updated the codifications of the Hague Convention of 1899, thus, in Convention IV (18 October 1907), the Laws and Customs of War on Land emphasizes command responsibility in three places: (i) Section I: On Belligerents: Chapter I: The Qualifications of Belligerents; (ii) Section III: Military Authority over the Territory of the Hostile State; and (iii) the Adaptation to Maritime War of the Principles of the Geneva Convention deal specifically with command responsibility.

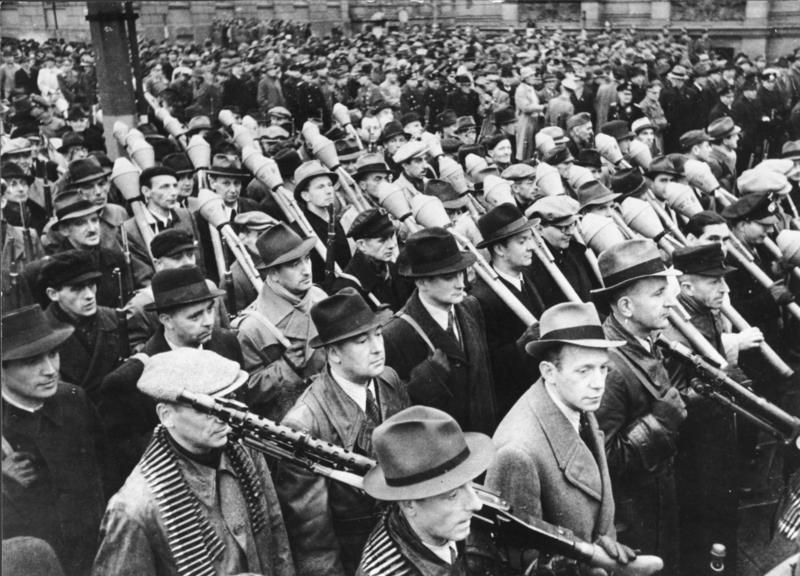
Nazi Germany (1933–1945) created the Volkssturm national militia to defend Germany from the Red Army in the last months of the Second World War (1939–1945) in Europe.

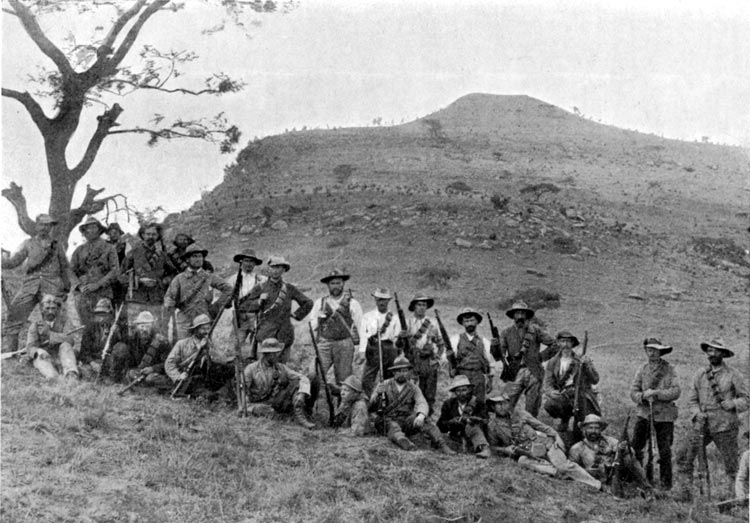
Irregular soldiers: Boer militias waged guerrilla warfare against the British Army in the Second Boer War (1899–1902) in South Africa.

To wit, Article 1 of Section I of Convention IV (Hague 1907) stipulates that:

The laws, rights, and duties of war apply not only to armies, but also to militia and volunteer corps fulfilling these conditions:

- To be commanded by a person responsible for his subordinates
- To have a fixed distinctive emblem recognizable at a distance
- To carry arms openly
- To conduct their operations in accordance with the laws and customs of war

Moreover, command responsibility is stipulated in Article 43, Section III of Convention IV:

The authority of the legitimate power having in fact passed into the hands of the occupant, the latter shall take all the measures in his power to restore, and ensure, as far as possible, public order and safety, while respecting, unless absolutely prevented, the laws in force in the country.

Furthermore, command responsibility is stipulated in Article 19 of Convention X, the Adaptation to Maritime War of the Principles of the Geneva Convention:

The commanders in chief of the belligerent fleets must arrange for the details of carrying out the preceding articles, as well as for cases not covered thereby, in accordance with the instructions of their respective Governments and in conformity with the general principles of the present Convention.

=== Militias and irregular formations ===
Since the 1990s, national governments have hired mercenary soldiers to replace regular army soldiers in fighting wars, which replacement of tactical combat personnel (infantry) – by a private military company – raises the legal matter of command responsibility for the war crimes and crimes against humanity committed by mercenaries ostensibly not subject to the military law of any belligerent party.

Political scientists and military jurists said that when the operational conduct of mercenary soldiers is indistinguishable from the operational conduct of the combatant soldiers (uniform, weapons, tactics, missions, etc.) that practical likeness renders the mercenary (militiaman or irregular combatant) into a legitimate agent of the belligerent state, who thus is subject to the legal liabilities of command responsibility codified in the Hague and in the Geneva Conventions.

=== Yamashita standard ===
As a legal doctrine of military law, command responsibility stipulates that an act of omission is a mode of individual criminal liability, whereby the commanding officer is legally responsible for the war crimes committed by his subordinates, by failing to act and prevent such crimes; and for failing to punish war-criminal subordinates. In late 1945, the war-crimes trial of General Tomoyuki Yamashita, Japanese Fourteenth Area Army, was the first instance of a commanding officer formally charged with a criminal act of omission by “unlawfully disregarding and failing to discharge his duty as a commander to control the acts of members of his command by permitting them to commit war crimes” in the Philippine Islands, where his soldiers committed atrocities against Allied prisoners of war, Filipino guerrillas, and civilians during the Second World War.

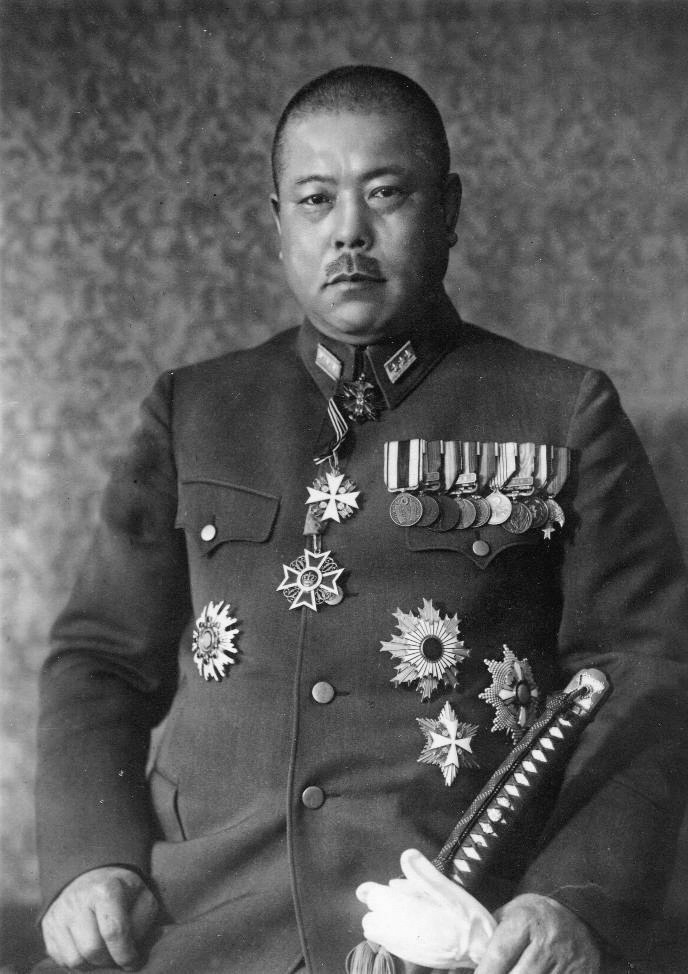
The Yamashita standard: Under the legal doctrine of command responsibility, Gen. Tomoyuki Yamashita was tried, judged, and put to death for the war crimes of his soldiers in the Pacific Theatre of the Second World War (1937–1945).

The International Military Tribunal for the Far East who charged, tried, and judged Gen. Yamashita guilty of war crimes established the Yamashita standard of criminal liability, whereby if "vengeful actions are widespread offenses, and there is no effective attempt by a commander to discover and control the criminal acts, [then] such a commander may be held responsible, even criminally liable". In 1946, with the Application of Yamashita, the U.S. Supreme Court resolved the ambiguous wording of that legal definition of command responsibility, which did not establish the commander's required degree of knowledge of the war crimes committed by his subordinates.

At Nuremberg, in the High Command Trial, the U.S. military tribunal ruled that in order for a commanding officer to be criminally liable for the war crimes of his subordinates "there must be a personal dereliction", which "can only occur where the act is directly traceable to him, or where his failure to properly supervise his subordinates constitutes criminal negligence on his part" by way of "a wanton, immoral disregard of the actions of his subordinates amounting to [the commander's] acquiescence" to the war crimes.

At Nuremberg, in the trial of the Hostages Case, the judgements of the U.S. military tribunal seemed to limit the circumstances wherein a commanding officer has a duty to investigate, document, and know in full of all instances of atrocity and war crime, especially if the commander already possessed information regarding the war crimes of his subordinate officers and soldiers.

After the war crimes trials of the Second World War, military law expanded the scope and deepened the definition of command responsibility, by imposing criminal liability upon commanding officers who fail to prevent their soldiers from committing war crimes against prisoners of war and atrocities against civilians. The last two war-crime trials of the subsequent Nuremberg trials (1946–1949), explicitly discussed the requisite standard of the mens rea (a guilty mind) for war crimes to occur, and determined that a lesser level of knowledge is sufficient for the commander to be complicit in the war crimes of his subordinates.

=== Superior responsibility ===
==== Legalized torture ====
Concerning the superior responsibility inherent to civilian control of the military, civil and military jurists said that prosecuting the war on terror would expose the officers of the George W. Bush administration (2001–2008) to legal liability for the war crimes and for the crimes against humanity committed by their military subordinates in Iraq and Afghanistan.

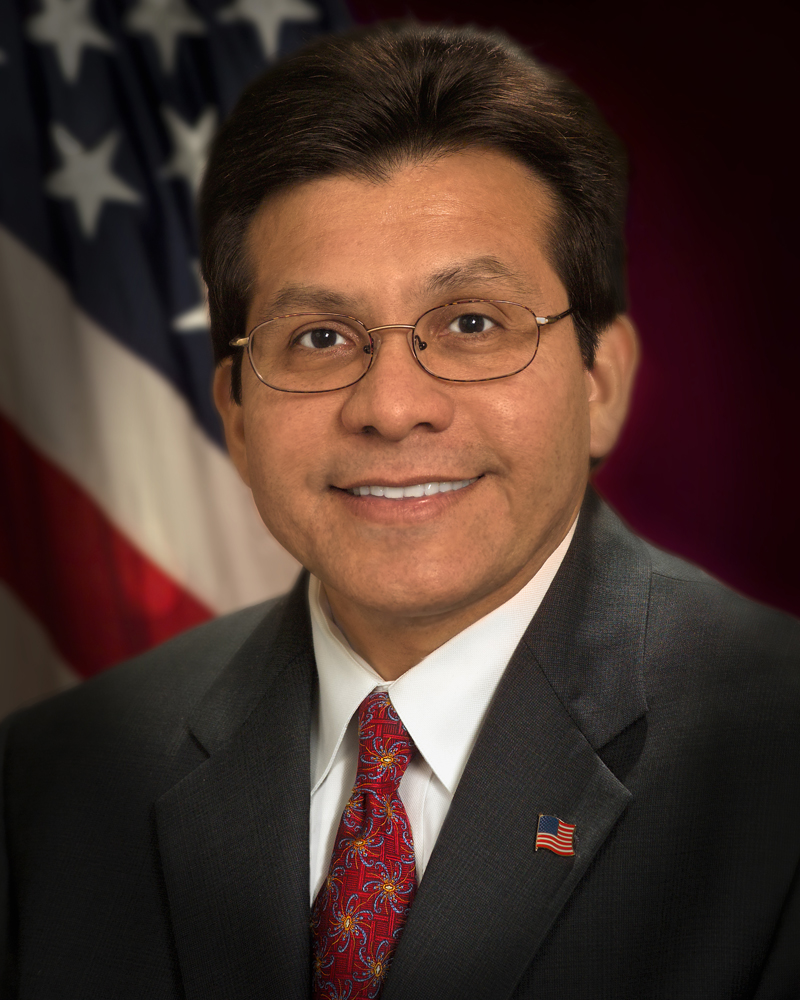
Civilian superior responsibility: In violation of the Geneva Conventions (1949), the U.S. Attorney General, Alberto Gonzáles (in office 2005–2007), voided U.S. recognition of the rights of habeas corpus and POW status for captured Al Qaeda fighters to facilitate prosecution of the Global War on Terror.

Consequent to the 11 September 2001 terrorist attacks, the U.S. government deployed legalistic arguments to justify torture by way of prisoner abuse, arguing that captured al Qaeda fighters are unlawful combatants – not soldiers – and thus could be subjected to enhanced interrogation methods, because under U.S. law they were classified as detainees and not as prisoners of war (POWs). To justify flouting the Geneva Conventions (1949) protecting prisoners of war, U.S. Attorney General Alberto Gonzáles said that classifying al Qaeda POWs as unlawful combatants "substantially reduces the threat of domestic criminal prosecution under the War Crimes Act of 1996".

In the case of Hamdan v. Rumsfeld, the U.S. Supreme Court overruled Gonzáles' reclassification of POWs as detainees; ruled that Common Article 3 of the Geneva Conventions applies to the Al Qaeda POWs at the Guantanamo Bay prison camp; and ruled that the Guantanamo military commission who tried, judged, and sentenced al Qaeda POWs was an illegitimate military tribunal because the U.S. Congress did not establish it.

Moreover, the Human Rights Watch organization said that, given his superior responsibility of government office, U.S. Secretary of Defense Donald Rumsfeld would be criminally liable for the torturing of the prisoner Mohammed al-Qahtani. In "The Real Meaning of the Hamdan Ruling Supreme Court: Bush Administration Has Committed War Crimes" (2006), the writer Dave Lindorff said that in flouting the Geneva Conventions, the Bush administration were legally liable for war crimes in US-occupied Iraq.

==== Universal jurisdiction ====
In 2006, a prosecutor of the Nuremberg trials (1945–1946), Benjamin Ferencz, said that the U.S. invasion of Iraq (2003) was a crime against peace that breached international law, and so exposed the superior responsibility of U.S. President George W. Bush for unilaterally launching an aggressive war. In November 2006, the Federal Republic of Germany invoked universal jurisdiction and began legal proceedings against U.S. defense secretary Rumsfeld, U.S. Attorney General Gonzáles, the jurist John Yoo, and CIA chief George Tenet, for their legal liability for U.S. war crimes.

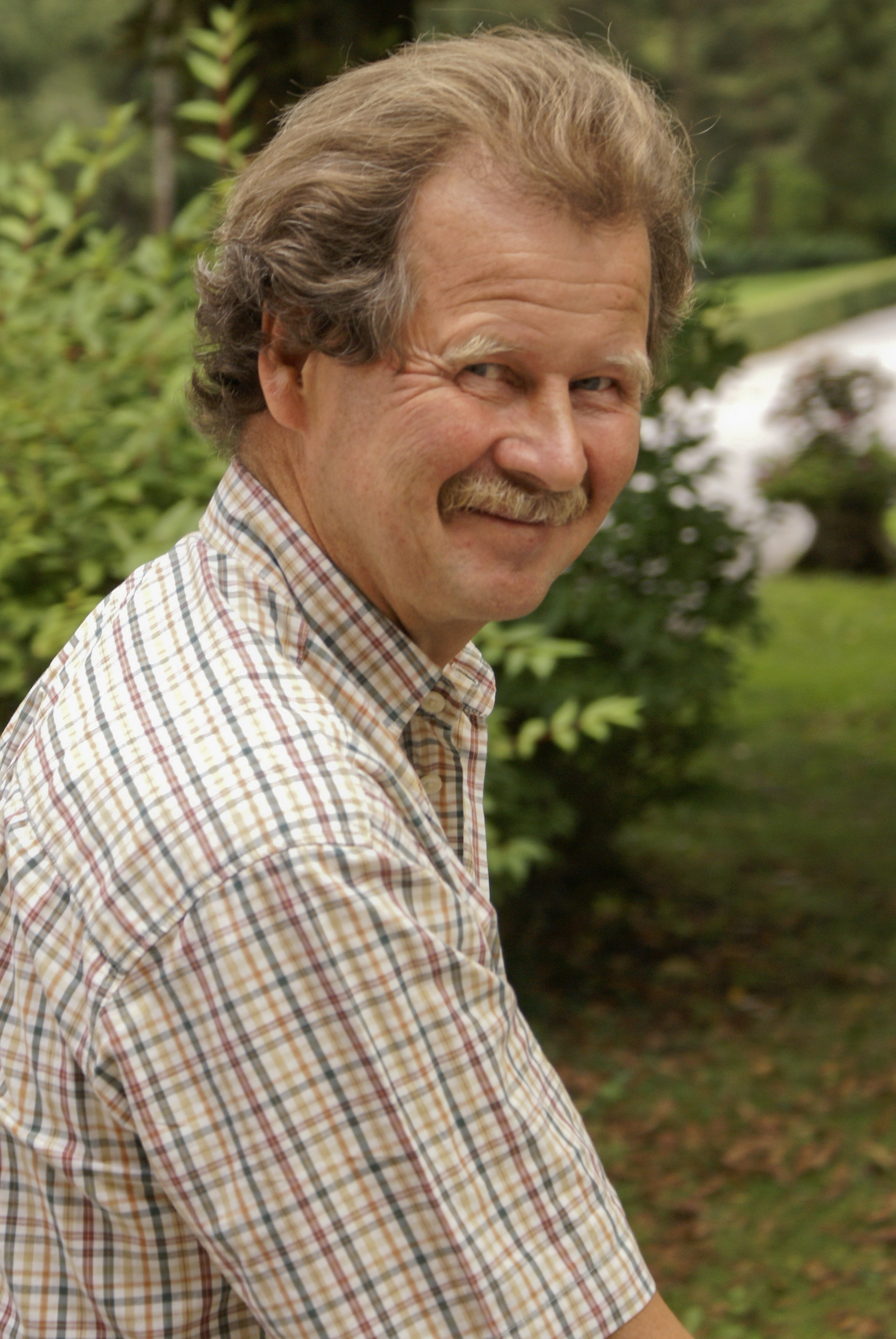
Manfred Nowak was the U.N. Special Rapporteur on torture from 2004 until 2010.

Moreover, in legal practice, the Military Commissions Act of 2006 (MCA) functions as an amnesty law for the Bush administration to flout their superior responsibility and thus their legal liability for war crimes committed when prosecuting the war on terror, because, by denying POWs the right of habeas corpus, the MCA retroactively rewrote the War Crimes Act of 1996, which defined war crime as any serious violation of the Geneva Convention, which left the POW no means of legal defense. In "Court 'can envisage' Blair Prosecution" (2007), the jurist Luis Moreno-Ocampo (ICC, 2003–2012) offered to begin a war-crimes enquiry for a war-crimes trial of British Prime Minister Tony Blair and U.S. President George W. Bush, for the International Criminal Court to hear.

In "History Will Not Absolve Us: Leaked Red Cross Report Sets up Bush Team for International War-crimes Trial" (2007), Nat Hentoff said that the report Leave No Marks: Enhanced Interrogation Techniques and the Risk of Criminality (2007), by Human Rights First and Physicians for Social Responsibility, would be evidence of U.S. war crimes at a war-crimes trial of the war on terror. Moreover, by the end of the Bush administration in 2008, the international community said that the United Nations Convention Against Torture (1985) obligated the U.S. government to prosecute the civilian and military officers who ordered and realized the torture of POWs captured during the war on terror.

The United Nations special rapporteur on torture, Manfred Nowak (in office 2004–2010), said that, as a former president of the U.S., George W. Bush had lost his head-of-state immunity and that international law obligated the U.S. government to start criminal proceedings against the government officials and military officers who violated the U.N. Convention Against Torture. In support of Nowak's statement, the jurist Dietmar Herz explained that former president George W. Bush is criminally responsible for adopting torture-as-interrogation, per the legal doctrine of superior responsibility stipulated in the international laws of war and the U.S. Code.

=== Codification ===
The Additional Protocol I (AP I, 1977) to the Geneva Conventions of 1949 was the first comprehensive codification of the legal doctrine of command responsibility. In the Additional Protocol No. I, the terms of Article 86(2) "explicitly address the knowledge factor of command responsibility", and stipulate that:

the fact that a breach of the Conventions or of this Protocol was committed by a subordinate does not absolve his superiors from ... responsibility ... if they knew, or had information which should have enabled them to conclude in the circumstances at the time, that he was committing or about to commit such a breach, and if they did not take all feasible measures within their power to prevent or repress the breach.

Therefore, in the execution of military operations, Article 86(2) obligates a commanding officer to "prevent, and, where necessary, to suppress and report to competent authorities" any violation of the Geneva Conventions and of Additional Protocol I.

=== Definitions ===
In discussions of command responsibility the term command is defined as

1. In De jure (legal) command, military and civilian, the determining factor is hierarchical subordination, not the rank of the commanding officer. There are four structures of command authority:
  1. Policy command: heads of state, high-rank government officials, and monarchs
  2. Strategic command: the War Cabinet and the Joint Chiefs of Staff
  3. Operational command: Military leadership in the field. The Yamashita standard established that a commanding officer cannot cede operational command to a subordinate officer; that operational commanders must fully exercise the potential of their authority to prevent the commission of war crimes – neither failure to supervise subordinates nor ambiguous orders exculpate the commander.
  4. Tactical command: direct command of troops on the ground.
  International law developed two types of de jure commanders:
  1. Prisoner-of-war (POW) camp commanders: With the application of the Alekowski decision, the ICTY established that the commander of a POW camp is entrusted with the welfare of every prisoner, and that the condition of subordination is irrelevant.
  2. Executive commanders: the supreme governing authority of a territory under military occupation. Subordination is again irrelevant – the commanding officer is responsible for the welfare of the civilian populace under his military occupation, as established in the High Command Trial and in the Hostages Trial at Nuremberg.
2. In de facto (factual) command, the effective, tactical control of soldiers in the field is the determining factor, not the rank of the commanding officer. This circumstance of de facto command authority requires the existence of a formal superior-subordinate relationship. The indicators (discriminating marks) of command authority are:
  1. Capacity to issue orders.
  2. Power of influence: recognized as a source of authority in the Ministries Trial (1947–1949) before the U.S. Military Tribunal at Nuremberg.
  3. Evidence stemming from distribution of tasks: the ICTY established the Nikolic test – superior status is deduced from an analysis of the distribution of military tasks among the soldiers of the unit, and applies to operational and POW camp commanders.

Moreover, Additional Protocol I to the Geneva Convention and the statutes of the International Tribunal for the former Yugoslavia (ICTY), the International Criminal Tribunal for Rwanda (ICTR), and the International Criminal Court (ICC) stipulate that the prevention and prosecution of war crimes and of crimes against humanity are legal responsibilities of a commanding officer.

== Application ==
=== Nuremberg tribunal ===
In the aftermath of the Second World War, the Nuremberg trials (20 November 1945 – 1 October 1946) resulted from the common opinion among jurists that the severity of Nazi war crimes and crimes against humanity (e.g. the Holocaust) required prosecution, judgement, and resolution by an International Military Tribunal authorized by the Nuremberg Charter (8 August 1945), which determined the procedures and legal bases to prosecute military officers, civil officials, and civilian people who committed:

Crime	Description
Crimes against peace	the planning, preparation, initiation or waging of a war of aggression, or a war in violation of international treaties, agreements or assurances, or participation in a common plan or conspiracy for the accomplishment of any of the foregoing.
War crimes	violations of the laws and customs of war. A list follows with, among other things, murder (which excludes killing in lawful combat), ill-treatment or deportation into slave labour or for any other purpose of the civilian population of or in occupied territory, murder or ill-treatment of prisoners of war or persons on the seas, the killing of hostages, the plunder of public or private property, the wanton destruction of cities, towns or villages, or devastation not justified by military necessity.
Crimes against humanity	Murder, extermination, enslavement, deportation, and other inhuman acts committed against any civilian population, before or during the war, or persecutions on political, racial or religious grounds in execution of or in connection with any crime within the jurisdiction of the Tribunal, whether or not in violation of the domestic law of the country where perpetrated.

Legally, the jurisdiction of the International Military Tribunal at Nuremberg applied to all "leaders, organisers, instigators and accomplices" who participated in planning and committing crimes against humanity and war crimes.

=== International Criminal Tribunal for the former Yugoslavia ===
The ICTY statute article 7 (3) establishes that the fact that crimes "were committed by a subordinate does not relieve his superior of criminal responsibility if he knew or had reason to know that the subordinate was about to commit such acts or had done so and the superior failed to take the necessary and reasonable measures to prevent such acts or to punish the perpetrators."

The Prosecutor v. Delalić et al. ("the Čelebići case") first considered the scope of command responsibility by concluding that "had reason to know" (article 7(3)) means that a commander must have "had in his possession information of a nature, which at the least, would put him on notice of the risk of ... offences by indicating the need for additional investigation in order to ascertain whether ... crimes were committed or were about to be committed by his subordinates."

In The Prosecutor v. Blaškić ("the Blaškić case") this view was corroborated. However, it differed regarding the mens rea required by AP I. The Blaškić Trial Chamber concluded that "had reason to know", as defined by the ICTY Statute, also imposes a stricter "should have known" standard of the mens rea.

The conflicting views of both cases were addressed by the Appeals Chambers in Čelebići and in a separate decision in Blaškić. Both rulings hold that some information of unlawful acts by subordinates must be available to the commander following which he did not, or inadequately, discipline the perpetrator.

The concept of command responsibility has developed significantly in the jurisprudence of the ICTY. One of the most recent judgements that extensively deals with the subject is the Halilović judgement of 16 November 2005 (para. 22–100).

=== International Criminal Tribunal for Rwanda ===
United Nations Security Council Resolution 955 (1994) set up an international criminal tribunal to judge people responsible for the Rwandan genocide and other serious violations of international law in Rwanda, or by Rwandan citizens in nearby states, between 1 January and 31 December 1994; additional later resolutions expanded the scope and timeline of the tribunal. The tribunal has jurisdiction over genocide, crimes against humanity, and war crimes.

The judgement against Jean-Paul Akayesu established rape as a war crime. Rape was placed in line with "other acts of serious bodily and mental harm" rather than the historical view of rape as "a trophy of war". Akayesu was held responsible for his actions and non-actions as mayor and police commander of a commune in which many Tutsis were killed, raped, tortured, and otherwise persecuted.

Another case prosecuted persons in charge of a radio station and a newspaper that incited and then encouraged the Rwandan genocide. The defendants were charged with genocide, incitement to genocide, and crimes against humanity for their positions of control and command in the "hate media", although they physically had not committed the acts.

=== International Criminal Court ===
Following several ad hoc tribunals, the international community decided on a comprehensive court of justice for future crimes against humanity. This resulted in the International Criminal Court, which identified four categories.

1. Genocide
2. Crimes against humanity
3. War crimes
4. Crimes of aggression

Article 28 of the Rome Statute of the International Criminal Court codified the doctrine of command responsibility. With Article 28(a), military commanders are imposed with individual responsibility for crimes committed by forces under their effective command and control if they

either knew or, owing to the circumstances at the time, should have known that the forces were committing or about to commit such crimes.

It uses the stricter "should have known" standard of mens rea, instead of "had reason to know", as defined by the ICTY Statute. Although the ICC Pre-Trial Chamber established a test for the "should have known" standard during the prosecution of Jean-Pierre Bemba, it has never been tested because Bemba had "actual knowledge" of crimes by his subordinates.

The Bush administration adopted the American Servicemembers' Protection Act and entered into Article 98 agreements in an attempt to protect any US citizen from appearing before this court. As such it interferes with implementing the command responsibility principle when applicable to US citizens.

=== War in Darfur ===
Human Rights Watch commented on this conflict by stating that:

individual commanders and civilian officials could be liable for failing to take any action to end abuses by their troops or staff ... The principle of command responsibility is applicable in internal armed conflicts as well as in international armed conflicts.

The Sunday Times in March 2006 and the Sudan Tribune in March 2008 reported that the UN Panel of Experts determined that Salah Gosh and Abdel Rahim Mohammed Hussein

had "command responsibility" for the atrocities committed by the multiple Sudanese security services.

Following an inquiry by the United Nations, regarding allegations of involvement of the Government in genocide, the dossier was referred to the International Criminal Court. On May 2, 2007, the ICC issued arrest warrants for militia leader Ali Muhammad al-Abd al-Rahman, also known as Ali Kushayb, of the Janjaweed, and Ahmad Muhammad Haroun for crimes against humanity and war crimes. To this day Sudan has refused to comply with the arrest warrants and has not turned them over to the ICC.

The International Criminal Court's chief prosecutor, Luis Moreno-Ocampo, announced on July 14, 2008, ten criminal charges against President Omar al-Bashir, accusing him of sponsoring war crimes, genocide, and crimes against humanity. The ICC's prosecutors have charged al-Bashir with genocide because he "masterminded and implemented a plan to destroy in substantial part" three tribal groups in Darfur because of their ethnicity. The ICC's prosecutor for Darfur, Luis Moreno-Ocampo, is expected within months to ask a panel of ICC judges to issue an arrest warrant for Bashir.

=== Zimbabwe ===
For his conduct as President of Zimbabwe, including allegations of torture and murder of political opponents, it was suggested Robert Mugabe may be prosecuted using this doctrine. Because Zimbabwe has not subscribed to the International Criminal Court's jurisdiction it may be authorised by the United Nations Security Council. The precedent for this was set by its referral to bring indictments relating to the crimes committed in Darfur.

== See also ==
- Joint criminal enterprise
- Cases before the International Criminal Court
- Corpse-like obedience
- Crime against humanity
- Crime against peace
- Desk murderer
- Geneva Conventions
- Jus ad bellum
- Jus in bello
- List of war crimes
- List of war criminals
- Nuremberg Charter
- Nuremberg Principles
- Parental responsibility
- Respondeat superior
- Rule of Law in Armed Conflicts Project
- Superior orders
- The Buck Stops Here
- Vicarious liability
- War crimes
- War Crimes Act of 1996
