= HMHS Dover Castle =

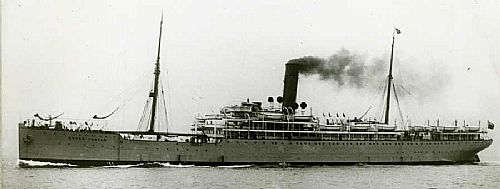
- Dover Castle before her wartime service

History

United Kingdom
- Name: Dover Castle
- Namesake: Dover Castle
- Owner: Union-Castle Mail Steamship Company
- Builder: Barclay Curle & Company, Glasgow
- Yard number: 443
- Launched: 4 February 1904
- Fate: Torpedoed and sunk, 26 May 1917

General characteristics
- Tonnage: 8,271 GRT
- Length: 476.4 ft (145.2 m)
- Beam: 56.7 ft (17.3 m)
- Draught: 31.9 ft (9.7 m)
- Propulsion: Steam, quadruple expansion engines, 969 nhp
- Speed: 14.5 knots (26.9 km/h)

HMHS Dover Castle (His Majesty's Hospital Ship) was a steam ship originally built for the Union-Castle Line and launched in 1904. In 1914 she was requisitioned for use as a British hospital ship during the First World War. On 26 May 1917 she was torpedoed 50 nautical miles (93 km; 58 mi) north of Bône, Algeria by the submarine UC-67 of the Imperial German Navy.

== History ==
Dover Castle was built by Barclay Curle & Company, Glasgow as yard number 443, in 1904 and launched on 4 February 1904. She was powered by quadruple expansion stream engines. She was built as a combined passenger and cargo vessel for the Union-Castle Mail Steamship Company, of London.

On 4 October 1916, RMS Franconia, while heading for Salonika, was torpedoed and sunk by the German U-boat UB-47 195 nautical miles (361 km; 224 mi) east of Malta. She was not carrying any troops but out of her 314 crew members, 12 died. The others (302) were saved by Dover Castle.

== Sinking ==
Wreck location

Dover Castle was torpedoed by the German U-boat UC-67 on 26 May 1917, while 50 miles (80 km) north of Bône on passage from Malta to Gibraltar. The initial explosion killed seven boiler stokers, but the crew was able to evacuate the wounded onto HMS Cameleon. The captain and a small crew tried to save the ship, but she was hit by a second torpedo an hour later and sank in three minutes at 37°45′N 7°45′E.

== Prosecution ==
Kptlt. Karl Neumann, commanding officer of UC-67, was tried for sinking the hospital ship at the Leipzig War Crimes Trials. The German Reichsgericht (Supreme Court) found him not guilty. Neumann admitted torpedoing the ship but pleaded that he was obeying orders issued by the German Admiralty. The German Government had asserted that the Allies were using hospital ships for military purposes and declared on 19 March 1917 that German submarines could attack hospital ships not complying with several German conditions. The court held that Neumann believed the order to be a lawful reprisal and therefore was not personally responsible for the sinking.

== See also ==
- List of hospital ships sunk in World War I
