= Superior orders =

Criminal defense of following the orders of a superior

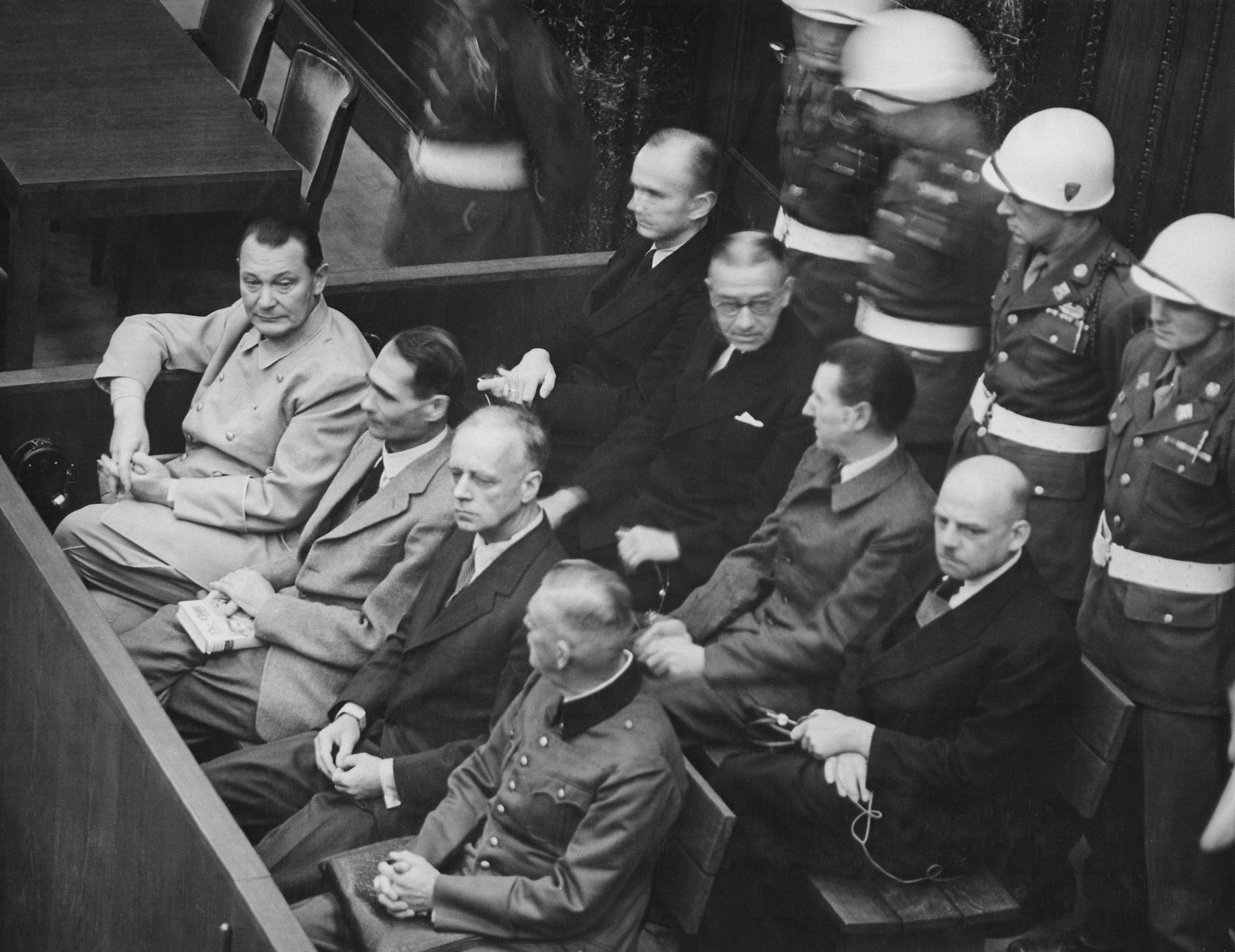
Defendants in the dock at the Nuremberg trials From left to right, front to back: Hermann Göring, Rudolf Hess, Joachim von Ribbentrop, Wilhelm Keitel, Karl Dönitz, Erich Raeder, Baldur von Schirach, Fritz Sauckel

Superior orders, also known as just following orders or the Nuremberg defense, is a plea in a court of law that a person, whether civilian, military or police, should not be considered guilty of committing crimes ordered by a superior officer or official. It is regarded as a complement to command responsibility.

One noted use of this plea or defense was by the accused in the 1945–1946 Nuremberg trials. These were a series of military tribunals held by the main victorious Allies of World War II to prosecute, among others, prominent members of the political, military and economic leadership of the defeated Nazi Germany. Under the London Charter of the International Military Tribunal that established them, the trials determined that the defense of superior orders was no longer enough to escape punishment but merely enough to lessen it.

Apart from the specific plea of superior orders, discussions about how the general concept of superior orders ought to be used, or ought not to be used, have taken place in various arguments, rulings and statutes that have not necessarily been part of "after-the-fact" war crimes trials, strictly speaking. Nevertheless, these discussions and related events help to explain the evolution of the specific plea of superior orders and the history of its usage.

Historically, the plea of superior orders has been used both before and after the Nuremberg Trials, with inconsistent rulings, up to the final ruling of the International Criminal Court in the Prosecutor v Ntaganda case.

== History ==
=== Before 1500 ===
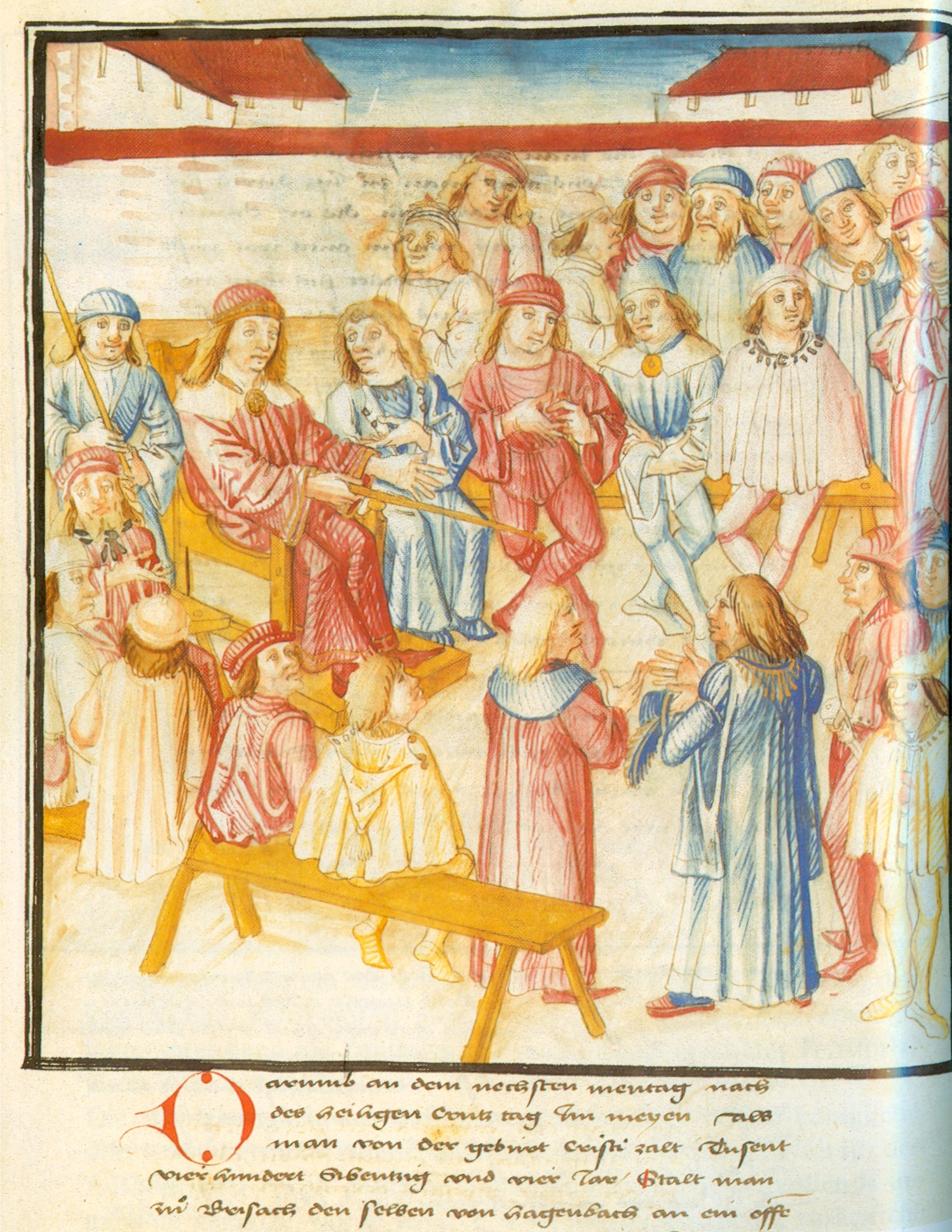
Hagenbach on trial, from Berner Chronik des Diebold Schilling dem Älteren

In 1474, in the trial of Peter von Hagenbach by an ad hoc tribunal of the Holy Roman Empire, the first known "international" recognition of commanders' obligations to act lawfully occurred.

Specifically, Hagenbach was put on trial for atrocities committed under his command but not by him directly, during the occupation of Breisach. This was the earliest modern European example of the doctrine of command responsibility. Since he was convicted for crimes that "he as a knight was deemed to have a duty to prevent", Hagenbach defended himself by arguing that he was only following orders from the Duke of Burgundy, Charles the Bold, to whom the Holy Roman Empire had given Breisach, but this defense was rejected and he was convicted of war crimes and beheaded.

=== 1900–1947 ===
==== Court-martial of Breaker Morant ====
During the Second Boer War, four Australian officers (Breaker Morant, Peter Handcock, Henry Picton, and George Witton) were indicted and tried for a number of murders, including those of prisoners who had surrendered and been disarmed. A significant part of the defense was that they were acting under orders issued by Lord Kitchener to "take no prisoners". However, these alleged orders were only issued verbally, were denied by Kitchener and his staff, and could not be validated in court. Furthermore, the crown prosecutor argued that even if such orders existed, they were "illegal orders" and was sustained by the court, resulting in a guilty verdict against all four men. In a ruling still reviled by some in modern Australia as a miscarriage of justice, the defendants' de facto commanding officer, Captain Alfred Taylor, whose own actions are widely considered to have been much more brutal and inhumane, was also tried but was acquitted on all charges.

==== German military trials after World War I ====
On June 4, 1921, the legal limits of superior orders were tested during the Leipzig War Crimes Trials that tried German military veterans for committing alleged war crimes in World War I in a civilian court after the Treaty of Versailles. One of the most famous of these trials remains that of Kapitänleutnant Karl Neumann of SM UC-67; the U-boat Officer Commanding who torpedoed and sank the British hospital ship the Dover Castle. Even though Neumann frankly admitted to having sunk the ship, he stated that he had done so on the basis of authorisation supplied by the German Admiralty. The Imperial German Government had accused the Allies of violating Articles X and XI of the Hague Convention of 1907 by using hospital ships for military purposes, such as transporting healthy troops, and the Imperial German Navy had accordingly decreed on 19 March 1917 that officers commanding individual U-boats could choose to fire upon Allied hospital ships under certain conditions. The Reichsgericht, then Germany's supreme court, acquitted Lt.-Capt. Neumann, accepting the defense that he had believed the sinking to be a lawful act. Further, the court stated "that all civilized nations recognize the principle that a subordinate is covered by the orders of his superiors".

Many other German veterans similarly facing prosecution for war crimes at Leipzig were also acquitted by either alleging ignorance of the law or citing the superior orders defense, creating immense dissatisfaction among the Allied news media and public. On the other hand, when the defendants at Leipzig could not reasonably claim that they did not know at the time that they were obeying criminal orders, this defense proved ineffective. For instance, following the sinking of the Canadian hospital ship HMHS Llandovery Castle, Oberleutnants zur See Ludwig Dithmar and John Boldt of SM U-86 were ordered to open fire with the deck gun on the unarmed shipwreck survivors and obeyed the order. They were both found guilty and sentenced, despite the very deep stigma and humiliation involved for a military officer in pre-1945 German culture, to serve their terms of incarceration in a civilian prison. However, the verdict was later overturned on appeal, on the grounds that their fugitive former commanding officer, Helmut Brümmer-Patzig, bore the lion's share of the guilt.

According to American historian Alfred de Zayas, however, "generally speaking, the German population took exception to these trials, especially because the Allies were not similarly bringing their own soldiers to justice." (See Victor's justice.)

Even so, dissatisfaction with the Leipzig trials is thought to be one of the main causes for the specific nullification of the superior orders defense in the August 8, 1945, London Charter of the International Military Tribunal. The removal has been attributed to the actions of Robert H. Jackson, a Justice of the United States Supreme Court, who was appointed Chief Prosecutor at the Nuremberg trials.

==== Dostler case ====
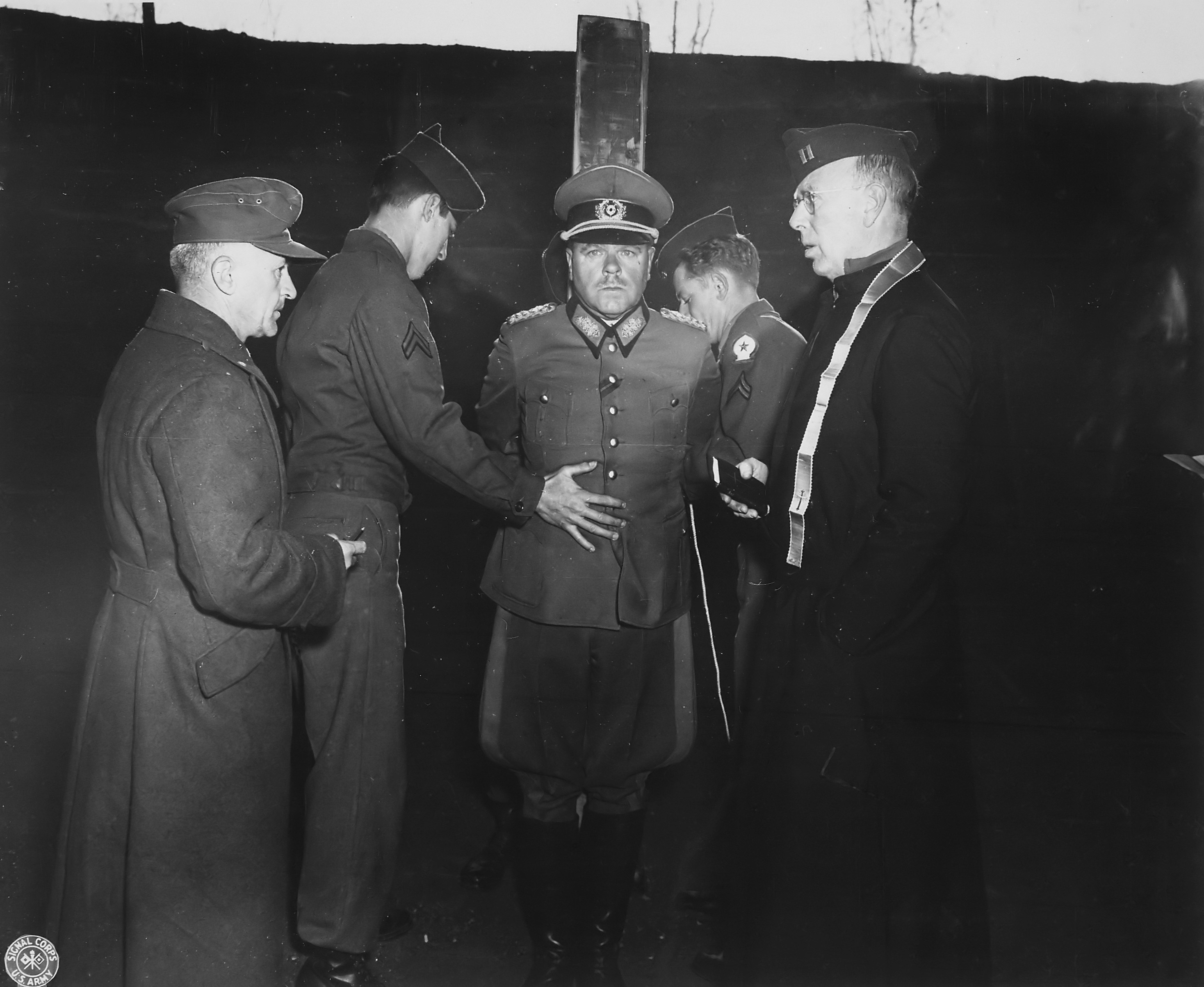
Dostler tied to a stake before the execution

On October 8, 1945, Anton Dostler was the first German general to be tried for war crimes by a US military tribunal at the Royal Palace of Caserta. He was accused of ordering the execution of 15 captured US soldiers of Operation Ginny II in Italy in March 1944. He admitted to ordering the execution, but said that he could not be held responsible because he was following orders from his superiors. The execution of the prisoners of war in Italy, ordered by Dostler, was an implementation of Adolf Hitler's Commando Order of 1942, which required the immediate execution of all Allied commandos, whether they were in proper uniforms or not, without trial if they were apprehended by German forces. The tribunal rejected the defense of superior orders and found Dostler guilty of war crimes. He was sentenced to death and executed by a firing squad on December 1, 1945, in Aversa.

The Dostler case became a precedent for the principle that was used in the Nuremberg Trials of German generals, officials, and Nazi leaders beginning in November 1945: using superior orders as a defense does not relieve officers from responsibility of carrying out illegal orders and their liability to be punished in court. The principle was codified in Principle IV of the Nuremberg Principles, and similar principles are in the 1948 Universal Declaration of Human Rights.

==== Nuremberg Trials after World War II ====
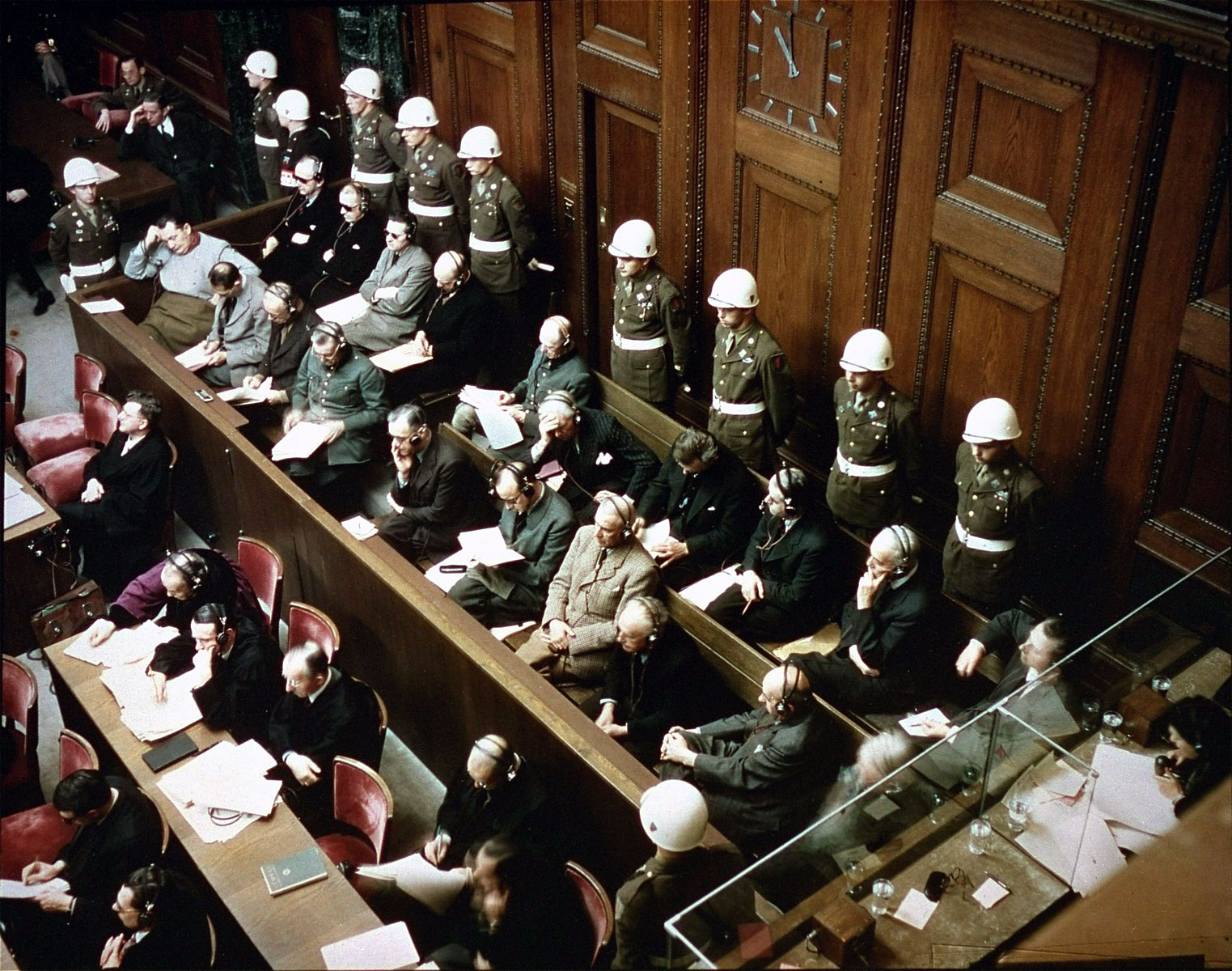
Photo of the trial at Nuremberg, depicting the defendants, guarded by American Military Police

In 1945–46, during the Nuremberg trials the issue of superior orders again arose. Before the end of World War II, the Allies suspected such a defense might be employed and issued the London Charter of the International Military Tribunal (IMT), which explicitly stated that following an unlawful order is not a valid defense against charges of war crimes.

Thus, under Nuremberg Principle IV, "defense of superior orders" is not a defense for war crimes, although it might be a mitigating factor that could influence a sentencing authority to lessen the penalty. Nuremberg Principle IV states:

The fact that a person acted pursuant to order of his Government or of a superior does not relieve him from responsibility under international law, provided a moral choice was in fact possible to him.

During the Nuremberg Trials, Wilhelm Keitel, Alfred Jodl, and other defendants unsuccessfully used the defense. They contended that while they knew Hitler's orders were unlawful, or at least had reason to believe they were unlawful, their place was not to question, but to obey. They claimed they were compelled to do so by the Führerprinzip (leader principle) that governed the Nazi regime, as well as their own oath of allegiance to Hitler. In most cases, the tribunal found that the defendants' offenses were so egregious that obedience to superior orders could not be considered a mitigating factor.

Before the trials, there was little Allied consensus about prosecuting Nazi war prisoners. Winston Churchill was inclined to have the leaders "executed as outlaws". The Soviets desired trials but wished there to be a presumption of guilt.

The German military law since 1872 said that while the superior is ("solely") responsible for his order, the subordinate is to be punished for his participation in it if he either transgressed the order on his own account, or if he knew the order to be criminal. The Nazis did not bother (or were too reluctant) to formalize many of their offenses (e.g., killing a non-combatant without trial), so the prosecutors at Nuremberg could have argued that the defendants broke German law to begin with. However, this line of argument was infrequently used.

==== "Nuremberg defense" ====
The trials gained so much attention that the "superior orders defense" has subsequently become interchangeable with the label "Nuremberg defense", a legal defense that essentially states that defendants were "only following orders" ("Befehl ist Befehl", literally "an order is an order") and so are not responsible for their crimes.

However, US General Telford Taylor, who had served as Chief Counsel for the United States during the Nuremberg trials, employed the term "Nuremberg defense" in a different sense. He applied it not to the defense offered by the Nuremberg defendants but to a justification put forward by those who refused to take part in military action (specifically America's involvement in the Vietnam War) that they believed to be criminal.

=== 1947–2000 ===
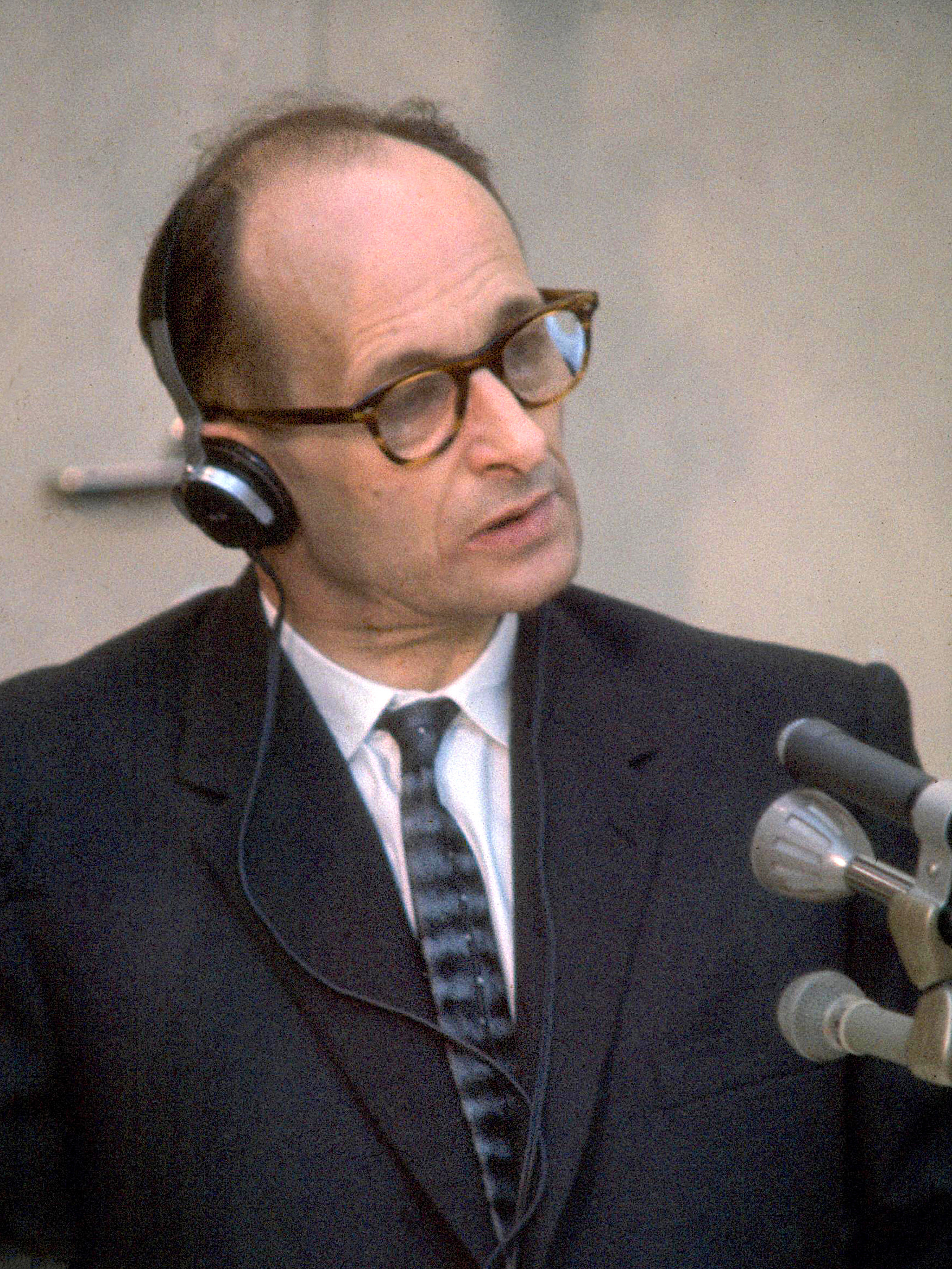
Eichmann on trial in 1961

The defense of superior orders again arose in the 1961 trial of Nazi war criminal Adolf Eichmann in Israel, as well as the trial of Alfredo Astiz of Argentina, who was responsible for many disappearances and kidnappings that took place during its last civil-military dictatorship (1976–1983). The dictators forced state-sponsored terrorism upon the population, resulting in what (to several sources) amounted to genocide.

The 1950s and 1960s saw the defense of Befehlsnotstand (English: necessity to obey orders), a concept in which a certain action is ordered which violates law but where the refusal to carry it out would lead to drastic consequences for the person refusing. This was quite successful in war crimes trials in Germany. With the formation of the Central Office of the State Justice Administrations for the Investigation of National Socialist Crimes this changed, as its research revealed that refusing an unlawful order did not result in punishment.

==== Israeli law since 1956 ====
In 1957, the Israeli legal system established the concept of a "blatantly illegal order" to explain when a military (or security-related) order should be followed, and when it must not be followed. The concept was explained in 1957 in the Kafr Qasim massacre ruling. The trial considered for the first time the issue of when Israeli security personnel are required to disobey illegal orders. The judges decided that soldiers do not have the obligation to examine each and every order in detail as to its legality, nor were they entitled to disobey orders merely on a subjective feeling that they might be illegal. On the other hand, some orders were manifestly illegal, and these must be disobeyed. Judge Benjamin Halevy's words, still much-quoted today, were that "The distinguishing mark of a manifestly illegal order is that above such an order should fly, like a black flag, a warning saying: 'Prohibited!' Illegality that pierces the eye and revolts the heart, if the eye is not blind and the heart is not impenetrable or corrupt."

Captain (res.) Itai Haviv, a signatory of the 'courage to refuse' letter of 2002, told of his unhappiness about his service for the Israel Defense Forces (IDF) and said "For 35 years a black flag was proudly hanging over our heads, but we have refused to see it". A translation note explains the "Black Flag" principle but adds "In the 45 years that passed since [the ruling], not even a single soldier was protected by a military court for refusing to obey a command because it was a 'black flag' command."

==== 1968 Mỹ Lai massacre ====
Following the Mỹ Lai massacre in 1968, the defense was employed during the court martial of William Calley. Some have argued that the outcome of the Mỹ Lai trial was a reversal of the laws of war that were set forth in the Nuremberg and Tokyo War Crimes Tribunals. Secretary of the Army Howard Callaway was quoted in the New York Times as stating that Calley's sentence was reduced because Calley believed that what he did was a part of his orders. Calley used the exact phrase "just following orders" when another American soldier, Hugh Thompson, confronted him about the ongoing massacre.

In United States v. Keenan, the accused was found guilty of murder after he obeyed an order to shoot and kill an elderly Vietnamese citizen. The Court of Military Appeals held that "the justification for acts done pursuant to orders does not exist if the order was of such a nature that a man of ordinary sense and understanding would know it to be illegal". The soldier who gave the order, Corporal Luczko, was acquitted by reason of insanity.

==== 1987 Canadian prosecution of Imre Finta ====
The Canadian government prosecuted Hungarian Nazi collaborator Imre Finta under its war crimes legislation in 1987. He was accused of organizing the deportation of over 8,000 Jews to Nazi death camps. He was acquitted on the defence that he was following the orders of a superior. The Canadian courts that accepted that verdict are the only ones in the world that recognize that legal defence.

==== 1998 Rome Statute of the International Criminal Court ====
The Rome Statute was agreed in 1998 as the foundation document of the International Criminal Court, established to try those accused of serious international crimes. Article 33, titled "Superior orders and prescription of law", states:

1. The fact that a crime within the jurisdiction of the Court has been committed by a person pursuant to an order of a Government or of a superior, whether military or civilian, shall not relieve that person of criminal responsibility unless:
  1. The person was under a legal obligation to obey orders of the Government or the superior in question;
  2. The person did not know that the order was unlawful; and
  3. The order was not manifestly unlawful.
2. For the purposes of this article, orders to commit genocide or crimes against humanity are manifestly unlawful.

=== 2000–present ===
==== Legal proceedings of Jeremy Hinzman in Canada ====
Nuremberg Principle IV, and its reference to an individual's responsibility, was at issue in Canada in the case of Hinzman v. Canada. Jeremy Hinzman was a U.S. Army deserter who claimed refugee status in Canada as a conscientious objector, one of many Iraq War resisters. Hinzman's lawyer, (at that time Jeffry House), had previously raised the issue of the legality of the Iraq War as having a bearing on their case. The Federal Court ruling was released on March 31, 2006, and denied the refugee status claim. In the decision, Justice Anne L. Mactavish addressed the issue of personal responsibility:

An individual must be involved at the policy-making level to be culpable for a crime against peace ... the ordinary foot soldier is not expected to make his or her own personal assessment as to the legality of a conflict. Similarly, such an individual cannot be held criminally responsible for fighting in support of an illegal war, assuming that his or her personal war-time conduct is otherwise proper.

On November 15, 2007, a quorum of the Supreme Court of Canada made of Justices Michel Bastarache, Rosalie Abella, and Louise Charron refused an application to have the Court hear the case on appeal, without giving reasons.

==== Legal proceedings of Ehren Watada in the United States ====
In June 2006, during the Iraq War, Ehren Watada refused to go to Iraq on account of his belief that the war was a crime against peace (waging a war of aggression for territorial aggrandizement), which he believed could make him liable for prosecution under the command responsibility doctrine. In this case, the judge ruled that soldiers, in general, are not responsible for determining whether the order to go to war is itself a lawful order – but are only responsible for those orders resulting in a specific application of military force, such as shooting civilians or treating POWs inconsistently with the Geneva Conventions. This is consistent with the Nuremberg defense, as only the civilian and military principals of the Axis were charged with crimes against peace, while subordinate military officials were not. It is often the case in modern warfare that while subordinate military officials are not held liable for their actions, neither are their superiors, as was the case with Calley's immediate superior Captain Ernest Medina.

Based on this principle, international law developed the concept of individual criminal liability for war crimes, which resulted in the current doctrine of command responsibility.

==== Legal proceedings of Vadim Shishimarin in Ukraine ====
On February 28, 2022, during the Russian invasion of Ukraine, Russian Sergeant Vadim Shishimarin shot and killed unarmed civilian Oleksandr Shelipov, a 62 year old Ukrainian man. His trial started on 13 May 2022, and on Wednesday 18 May, Shishimarin pleaded guilty to the killing. On Friday 20 May, Shishimarin's defense lawyer asked for his client to be acquitted of war crimes. He argued that Shishimarin had intended not to kill but only to carry out the order formally, which Shishimarin had refused twice before succumbing to pressure from other soldiers. He further argued that the shots were unaimed, fired from a moving vehicle with a faulty tire, and only one bullet out of the burst hit. Shishimarin was sentenced to life in prison, reduced to 15 years on appeal.

=== Summary ===
Date	Preceding context	Jurisdiction / decisionmaker	Defendant(s) or case(s)	[found] "responsible" despite superior orders	[found] "not responsible" because of superior orders
1474	the occupation of Breisach	ad hoc tribunal of the Holy Roman Empire	Peter von Hagenbach	yes (see details)	
1921	World War I	Germany's Supreme Court (trials after World War I)	Lieutenant Karl Neumann and others		yes (see details)
1945	World War II	Nuremberg trials after World War II	all defendants	yes (see details)	
1998	preparation for future cases	Rome Statute of the International Criminal Court	future cases under Article 33 of the Rome Statute of the International Criminal Court	in cases of genocide and possibly other cases (see details)	possibly in cases other than genocide (see details)
2006	Iraq War	Justice Anne L. Mactavish – Federal Court (Canada)	Jeremy Hinzman (refugee applicant)		equivalent to yes (see details)
2022	Russian invasion of Ukraine	Serhiy Agafonov	Vadim Shishimarin	yes	

Note: Yellow rows indicate the use of the precise plea of superior orders in a war crimes trial, as opposed to events regarding the general concept of superior orders.

== Arguments ==
The superior orders defense is still used with the following rationale in the following scenario: An "order" may come from one's superior at the level of national law. But according to Nuremberg Principle IV, such an order is sometimes "unlawful" according to international law. Such an "unlawful order" presents a legal dilemma from which there is no legal escape: On one hand, a person who refuses such an unlawful order faces the possibility of legal punishment at the national level. On the other hand, a person who accepts such an unlawful order faces the possibility of legal punishment at the international level. Nuremberg Principle II responds to that dilemma by stating: "The fact that internal law does not impose a penalty for an act which constitutes a crime under international law does not relieve the person who committed the act from responsibility under international law."

This might present a legal dilemma, but Nuremberg Principle IV speaks of "a moral choice" as being just as important as legal decisions: "The fact that a person acted pursuant to order of his Government or of a superior does not relieve him from responsibility under international law, provided a moral choice was in fact possible to him".

In moral choices or ethical dilemmas a decision is often made by appealing to a "higher ethic". One found in many religions and in secular ethics is the ethic of reciprocity, or Golden Rule. It states that one has a right to just treatment, and therefore has a reciprocal responsibility to ensure justice for others.

Although messengers are not usually responsible for the content of messages, the Babylonian Talmud (3rd to 5th century corpus of Jewish law) states, "There is no messenger in a case of sin." Joseph Telushkin interprets the precept to mean that "if a person is sent to perform an evil act, he cannot defend his behavior by saying he was only acting as another's messenger. ... [T]he person who carries out the evil act bears responsibility for the evil he or she does." This is because God's law (i.e. morality) supersedes human law.

Another argument against the use of the superior orders defense is that it does not follow the traditional legal definitions and categories established under criminal law, where a principal is any actor who is primarily responsible for a criminal offense. Such an actor is distinguished from others who may also be subject to criminal liability as accomplices, accessories or conspirators. (See also the various degrees of liability: absolute liability, strict liability, and mens rea.)

The common argument is that every individual under orders should be bound by law to immediately relieve of command an officer who gives an obviously unlawful order to their troops. This represents a rational check against organizational command hierarchies.

Nuremberg Principle IV, the international law that counters the superior orders defense, is legally supported by the jurisprudence found in certain articles in the Universal Declaration of Human Rights that deal indirectly with conscientious objection. It is also supported by the principles found in paragraph 171 of the Handbook on Procedures and Criteria for Determining Refugee Status, which was issued by the Office of the United Nations High Commissioner for Refugees (UNHCR). Those principles deal with the conditions under which conscientious objectors can apply for refugee status in another country if they face persecution in their own for refusing to participate in an illegal war.

== Bibliography ==
- Yoram Dinstein: The Defence of Obedience to Superior Orders in International Law, Sijthoff-Leyden, 1965.
- Paola Gaeta: The Defence of Superior Orders: The Statute of the International Criminal Court versus Customary International Law, pdf, European Journal of International Law, 1999.
- Matthew Lippman: Conundrums of Armed Conflict: Criminal Defenses to Violations of the Humanitarian Law of War pdf, Penn State International Law Review, 1996, Volume 15.

== See also ==
- Corpse-like obedience (Kadavergehorsam)
- Desk murderer
- Insubordination
- Milgram experiment
- Radbruch formula
- Tu quoque defense
- Vicarious liability
