= Leipzig war crimes trials =

Series of trials at the end of World War I

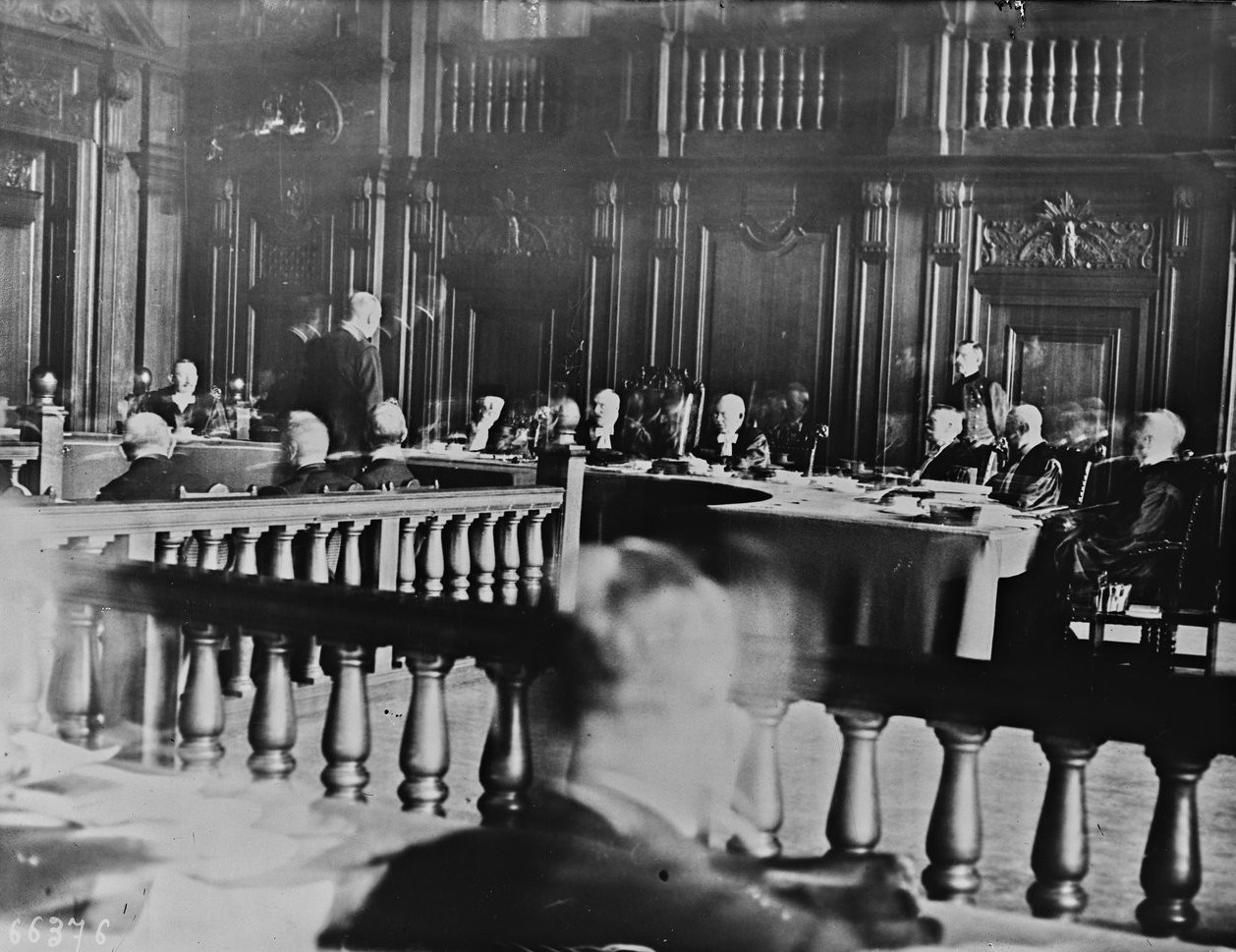
First session of the trials, 23 May 1921

The Leipzig war crimes trials were held in 1921 to try alleged German war criminals of the First World War before the German Reichsgericht (Supreme Court) in Leipzig, as part of the penalties imposed on the German government under the Treaty of Versailles. Twelve people were tried (with mixed results), and the proceedings were widely regarded at the time as a failure. In the longer term, they were seen by some as a significant step toward the introduction of a comprehensive system for the prosecution of international law violations.

== Background ==
During the First World War the Allied leaders came up with a new concept, that once victory was achieved, defeated enemy leaders should face criminal charges for international law violations made during the war. On 25 January 1919, during the Paris Peace Conference, the Allied governments established the Commission of Responsibilities to make recommendations to that effect. As a result, articles 227–230 of the Treaty of Versailles stipulated the arrest and trial of German officials defined as war criminals by the Allied governments. Article 227 made provision for the establishment of a special tribunal, presided over by a judge from each of the major Allied powers—Britain, France, Italy, United States and Japan. It identified the former Kaiser Wilhelm II as a war criminal, and demanded that an extradition request be addressed to the Dutch government, which had given him asylum in the Netherlands since his abdication in November 1918. Article 228 allowed the Allied governments to try alleged German war criminals in military tribunals. In violation of the legal principle of double jeopardy, Allied prosecutions could proceed even in cases where the accused had already been tried, convicted and sentenced in court-martial proceedings under German military law. The German government was required to comply with any extradition order issued by the Allied powers to that effect.

Following the conclusion of the treaty, the Allied governments began their legal and diplomatic efforts to arrest the former Kaiser. On 28 June 1919, the day the treaty was signed, the President of the Paris Peace Conference addressed a diplomatic note to the Dutch government demanding the extradition of the former Kaiser, a very near relative of the Dutch royal family. On 7 July the Dutch Foreign Office replied that extraditing him would violate the Netherlands' policy of neutrality. Eventually the issue of trying Wilhelm was dropped, and he remained at his Dutch estate of Huis Doorn until his death on 4 June 1941.

In anticipation of further Allied action, the German National Assembly established a Central Bureau for the Defence of Germans Accused of War Crimes. On 4 October 1919, at a meeting in Berlin, Johannes Goldsche of the Prussian Bureau of Investigation reported that his office had compiled some 5,000 detailed dossiers on Allied war crimes, which could be made immediately available to defence counsel in the event of prosecutions being brought against German soldiers. The bureau had also investigated Allied allegations of German war crimes, but in this case was not planning to make its findings public for fear of possible repercussions from the Allies.

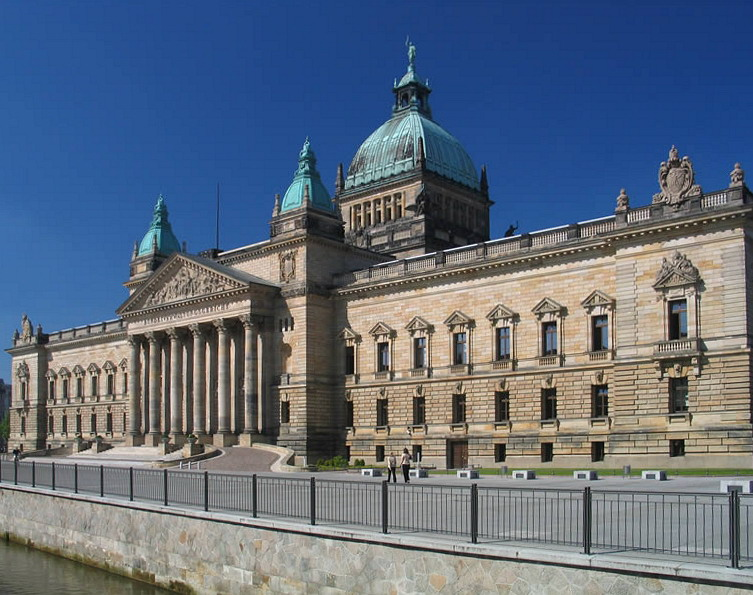
The Reich Court building in Leipzig

On 3 February 1920, the Allies submitted a further list of 900 names of alleged war criminals to the German government. The Germans refused to extradite any German citizens to Allied governments, and suggested instead trying them within the German justice system, i.e. at the Reichsgericht in Leipzig. This proposal was accepted by the Allied leaders, and in May 1920 they handed the Germans a reduced list of 45 accused persons. Not all these people could be traced, and in other cases there was difficulty in finding credible evidence. In the end, only twelve individuals from the lists were brought to trial. Another three people who were not on any list were tried by Reichsgericht before the other cases began: Dietrich Lottmann, Paul Niegel, and Paul Sangerhausen. The three men were charged with plunder for acts of looting committed in during the Rape of Belgium.

== Trials ==
The trials of Lottmann, Niegel, and Sangerhausen were held in January 1921. All three men were found guilty. Lottmann was sentenced to five years in a civilian prison, Niegel was sentenced to four years in a civilian prison, and Sangerhausen was sentenced to two years in a civilian prison.

The other trials were held before the Reichsgericht (comprising seven judges) in Leipzig from 23 May to 16 July 1921.

=== Heynen ===
Sergeant Karl Heynen, who was charged with using corporal punishment, including his fists and rifle butt, against 200 British and 40 Russian POWs, who were under his command as forced labourers at the Friedrich der Grosse coal mine at Herne, in Westphalia. Heynen further stood accused, of having driven a British POW named Cross insane through various cruelties, including throwing the POW into a shower bath with alternating hot and cold water, for half an hour. It was further alleged that, after a British POW named MacDonald had escaped and been recaptured, that Heynen had hit MacDonald with his rifle butt, knocked him down and kicked him. Also, on 14 October 1915, Heynen stood accused of having threatened the POWs under his command with summary execution if they did not immediately return to work during an attempted strike action. Heynen had already been court-martialed and convicted for these same offences and had been sentenced to fourteen days' "detention in a fortress", which was suspended until the end of the war. At the insistence of the British Government, double jeopardy was set aside and Heynen was retried for the same offences. He was acquitted for his actions during the strike, as the court ruled that POWs were entitled to complain but not to refuse to follow orders, but convicted of fifteen other incidents of unnecessary brutality.

In passing sentence, the court declared, "One cannot help acknowledging that this is a case of extremely rough acts of brutality aggravated by the fact that these acts were perpetrated against defenceless prisoners against whom one should have acted in the most proper manner, if the good reputation of the German Army and the respect of the German Nation as a nation of culture was to be upheld... There can be no question of detention in a fortress in view of the nature of his offences, especially those committed against prisoners who were undoubtedly sick. On the contrary, a sentence of imprisonment must be passed." Even though imprisonment in a regular jail was considered degrading to military honour, Heynen was sentenced to ten months in a civilian prison.

=== Müller ===
Captain Emil Müller was a former commandant of the POW camp at Flavy-le-Martel, which had, long before his arrival, turned into, "a large cesspool", where 1,000 British POWs had been held. He proved he had tried very hard to improve conditions at the camp and was hamstrung from doing more by military bureaucracy. His lawyer showed how a dysentery outbreak that killed 500 POWs happened after his command had ended. The court considered nine instances of deliberate personal cruelty to be proven, as well as an additional case in which Müller allowed a subordinate to mistreat a POW, other cases of breaches of regulations, as well as two cases of verbal abuse. He was sentenced to six months in a civilian prison, including time served. The term "command responsibility" was first used in this trial.

=== Neumann ===
Private Robert Neumann, who had guarded Allied POWs who were forced labourers at a chemical factory at Pommerensdorf, also stood accused on unnecessary brutality. In some cases, Neumann demonstrated that he only followed orders from Sergeant Heinrich Trinke, who could not be found for trial. In other cases, Neumann was found to have physically abused POWs under his own initiative. The court considered twelve out of the seventeen charges against Neumann to be proved. In passing sentence, the court declared, "The accused kicked, struck, or otherwise physically ill-treated prisoners who were under his charge and were his subordinates. He did this deliberately and intended that his blows should hurt the prisoners. In doing this he had absolutely no justification." He was sentenced to six months in a civilian prison, with the four months he had already spent awaiting trial counting as part of his sentence.

=== Dover Castle ===
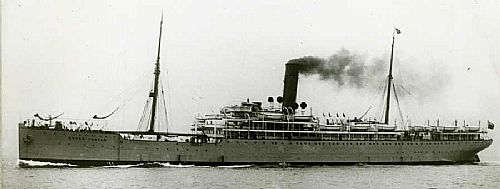
HMHS Dover Castle

Kapitänleutnant Karl Neumann of U-boat UC-67, who had torpedoed and sunk the British hospital ship HMHS Dover Castle in the Mediterranean Sea on 26 May 1917, stood accused of war crimes on the high seas. He proved he had only followed orders from his superiors in the Imperial German Navy. The Imperial German Government had accused the Allies of violating Articles X and XI of the Hague Convention of 1907 by using hospital ships for military purposes, such as transporting troops, and had decreed on 19 March 1917 that U-boats could sink hospital ships under certain conditions. The court held that Kapitänleutnant Neumann had believed the sinking to be a lawful act and found him not guilty of war crimes.

=== Llandovery Castle ===
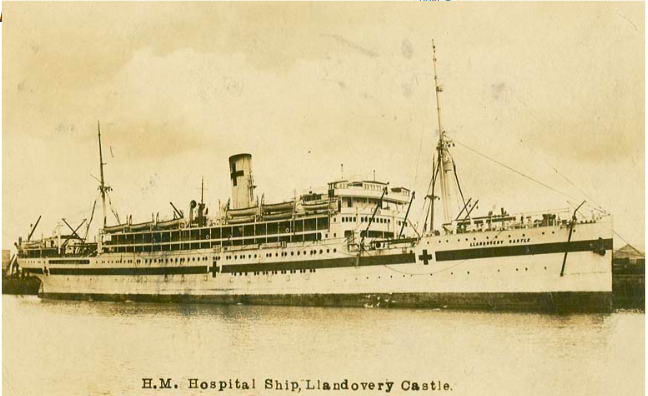
HMHS Llandovery Castle

Oberleutnant zur See Ludwig Dithmar and Oberleutnant zur See John Boldt, two junior officers who had served on the submarine U-86 in World War I, were put on trial for war crimes during the trials for their involvement in the sinking of Canadian hospital ship Llandovery Castle on 27 June 1918 off the coast of Ireland. Dithmar and Boldt were accused of machine-gunning the survivors of Llandovery Castle's sinking while they were in lifeboats, during what was the deadliest Canadian maritime disaster of World War I. A total of 234 medical personnel, soldiers and sailors died during the sinking and subsequent ramming and machine-gunning of the lifeboats by the crew of U-86, while only 24 people in a single lifeboat survived the sinking. During the trials, Dithmar and Boldt were both found guilty of war crimes and were sentenced to four years in prison, though these were later overturned on appeal based on the argument that both men were only following orders and their commanding officer, Kapitänleutnant Helmut Brümmer-Patzig was solely responsible. Brümmer-Patzig had fled to the Free City of Danzig before the trials started and was never prosecuted. In spite of the appeal judgement, the original decision is still considered precedent and was eventually codified in the Rome Statute as part of international criminal law.

=== Ramdohr ===
Max Ramdohr was charged with crimes against civilian non-combatants during the Rape of Belgium. He was found not guilty.

=== POW massacres ===
Lieutenant-General Karl Stenger, the former commander of the 58th Infantry Brigade, stood accused of having ordered Major Benno Crusius in August 1914 to subject all French POWs to summary execution. Crusius stood accused of two separate massacres of French POWs, at Saarburg on 21 August 1914 and in a forest near Sainte-Barbe on 26 August 1914. Stenger denied that he had issued any such orders, and was found not guilty of war crimes.

In regard to both POW massacres, Crusius did not deny having passed on and carried out "the order". The court ruled that medical experts had convincingly demonstrated that, "at the moment when the alleged brigade order was passed on", Crusius "was suffering from a morbid derangement of his mental faculties which rendered impossible the exercise of his own volition. These experts do not hold that this was already the case on 21 August. The Court shares this view... As in accordance with practice, reasonable doubt as to the volition of the guilty party does not allow of a pronouncement of guilt, no sentence can be passed against Crusius as regards the 26th of August."

Despite being found not guilty by reason of insanity for the massacre at Saint Barbe, Crusius was found guilty of war crimes for the massacre at Saarburg on 21 August 1914. He was accordingly deprived of the right to wear an officer's uniform and was sentenced to two years in a civilian prison.

=== Laule ===
Oberleutnant Adolph Laule stood charged with the killing of Captain Migat of the French Army, who had fallen asleep while his unit marched away. When Laule and his men had come upon the Captain and attempted to take him prisoner, Migat had resisted, had shaken off the Germans who were attempting to restrain him, and had been shot in the back while running away. The court found that Laule had not fired the fatal shot or ordered his men to shoot. They had acted on their own, without orders. As a result, he was found not guilty.

=== Kassel ===
Lieutenant-General Hans von Schack and Major-General Benno Kruska were charged with 1,280 counts of murder, for their actions during a 1915 typhus outbreak at a POW camp at Kassel. The court noted that out of eighteen German doctors assigned to the camp, only two failed to catch the disease and that four of them died from it. Also, 34 German guards at the camp had caught typhus during the outbreak. The court ultimately ruled that, "what most contributed to the outbreak of the epidemic was the order of the Camp Commandant that the Russians were to be placed with the other prisoners. The responsibility for this, however, rests exclusively with the High Command of the Army. An order for this was given by the War Office on 18th October 1914, and this order states that it was advisable to place the Russian prisoners with their Allies, the English and French. From the medical point of view, the doctor at the camp made representations against this... The higher authorities insisted on their order, and the parties concerned had nothing to do but obey." In acquitting both defendants, the court declared, "General Kruska, as well as General von Schack, is as the State Attorney has himself said, to be acquitted absolutely... The trial before this Court has not revealed even a shadow of proof for these monstrous accusations."

== Response ==
Even though the sentences were based on those recommended for the same offences under German military law, outside of the Weimar Republic, the trials were seen as a travesty of justice because of the small number of cases tried and the perceived leniency of the judges in passing sentence.

Lawyer and historian Alfred de Zayas wrote, "Generally speaking, the German population took exception to these trials, especially because the Allies were not similarly bringing their own soldiers to justice."

After Sergeant Karl Heynen was sentenced to ten months' imprisonment, the Leipzig correspondent of the London Times called the trial "a scandalous failure of justice". One British MP called for the trials to be moved to London. Another declared that the "contemptible" sentence given to Sergeant Heynen had reduced the trials to "a judicial farce".

In response, the German Gazette commented, "The first verdict in the series of Leipzig trials has agitated public opinion in two great countries, Germany and England, in apparently sharply contrasting ways. The degree of punishment has been criticised in England in a way that is in the highest degree wounding to German sensibilities." French Prime Minister Aristide Briand was so outraged by the acquittal of Lieutenant-General Stenger for the two POW massacres that the French Mission observing the trials was recalled in protest.

Within Germany, on the other hand, the trials were seen as excessively harsh for several reasons:

- The accused seemed in several cases to have been only following orders; merely trying to perform their duty under difficult conditions.
- Several of the charges seemed spurious.
- Imprisonment in a civilian jail was regarded as insulting to military men.

On 15 January 1922, a commission of Allied jurists, appointed to inquire into the trials, concluded that it was useless to proceed with them any further and recommended that the remaining accused should be handed over to the Allies for trial. This was not done, and the trials were quietly abandoned.

Claud Mullins, who had observed the trials on behalf of the British Government, argued that they should be understood in light of the pre-1945 German attitude toward authority. He commented, "I always think that it is significant that there are notices in many German railway carriages that, 'In case of a dispute as to whether the window should be open or closed, the guard will decide.' Germans have a respect for authority which we British can scarcely understand." He said even brief terms in a civilian prison, rather than detention in a fortress, which was the usual punishment under German military law, were a far harsher sentence than people in Allied countries realized because of the very intense humiliation involved. "Six months in a civil jail," he wrote, "thus meant far more than three years' detention in a fortress, which is the usual military punishment. The Germans have always had strange ideas about service 'honour' and this 'honour' was deeply wounded by a sentence of imprisonment, such as mere civilians received." He concluded, "None the less the fact remains that these trials were neither 'a travesty of justice' nor a 'farce.' There was throughout a genuine desire to get to the bottom of the facts and to arrive at the truth. This and the fact that a German Court condemned the doctrines of brutality, which General von Fransecky and Admiral von Trotha applauded, are the important results that will live in history long after the miserable offenders have been forgotten."

== Ottoman military tribunals ==
The effort to prosecute Ottoman war criminals was also taken up by the Paris Peace Conference, and ultimately included in the Treaty of Sèvres (1920) with the Ottoman Empire. Armenian historian Vahakn N. Dadrian comments that the Allied efforts at prosecution were an example of "a retributive justice [that] gave way to expedience of political accommodation". Even so, Armenian poet Peter Balakian describes the Turkish courts-martial as "a milestone in the history of war-crimes tribunals."

== Legacy ==
Writing in 2002, M. Cherif Bassiouni, an American professor of law specialising in international criminal law and an expert on war crimes, summarised the impact of the post-first-world-war trials of war criminals as follows:

"Thus, apart from helping to lay the legal foundations for international criminal justice in the future, the Allies' experiment in retributive justice following the First World War was a dismal failure. Despite ample Allied resources, the availability of the exhaustive investigative findings of the Commission, and an enemy prostrate from war, hunger, and internal revolution, very few prosecutions were ever undertaken, and of those that were, the sentences handed down were either comparatively light or never fully executed. The value of justice had not penetrated the practices of realpolitik."

In assessing the failure of the Allies to enforce the sections of the Versailles treaty related to war crimes (Articles 227-230), the United Nations War Crimes Commission identified four key failings. The first was the failure to begin the proceedings quickly after the war when they still had popular and governmental support. The second was the lack of unity amongst the Allies. The third was the relative immaturity of international scene at that stage. The fourth was the poor drafting of the relevant parts of the Versailles treaty.

During the Second World War, Allied governments again decided to try, after the war, defeated Axis leaders for war crimes committed during the war. These initiatives eventually led to the Nuremberg Trials and International Military Tribunal for the Far East.

Following the end of the Cold War, the same trend led to the establishment of the International Criminal Court in 2002.

== See also ==
- War crimes trial
- Reichstag inquiry into guilt for World War I

== Bibliography ==
- Carnegie Endowment for International Peace (1919). Violation of the Laws and Customs of War: Reports of Majority and Dissenting Reports of American and Japanese Members of the Commission of Responsibilities, Conference of Paris 1919. London and New York.
- De Zayas, Alfred M. (1989). The Wehrmacht War Crimes Bureau, 1939–1945. Lincoln, Neb.: University of Nebraska Press. ISBN 0803299087.
- Hankel, Gerd (1982). The Leipzig Trials: German War Crimes and Their Legal Consequences after World War I. Dordrecht: Republic of Letters. ISBN 9789089791320.
- Mullins, Claud (1921). The Leipzig Trials: An Account of the War Criminals' Trials and Study of German Mentality. London: H. F. & G. Witherby.
- Willis, James F. (2014). Prologue to Nuremberg: The Politics and Diplomacy of Punishing War Criminals of the First World War. Westport, Conn.: Greenwood Press. ISBN 9780313214547.
- Yarnall, John (2011). Barbed Wire Disease: British & German Prisoners of War, 1914–19. Stroud: Spellmount. pp. 183–96. ISBN 9780752456904.
