= Parental responsibility (criminal) =

Liability of parents for action of children

In Canada and the United States, the term parental responsibility refers to the potential or actual liability that may be incurred by parents for the behavior of their children.

== In Canada law ==
Parental responsibility legislation has been enacted in three Canadian provinces: Manitoba (1997), Ontario (2000), and British Columbia (2001).

Under the Parental Responsibility Act, 2000, a "child" is anyone under the age of 18 years, and "parent" means:

- either the biological, adoptive, or legal guardian parent of the child,
- or the person who has lawful custody of, or a right of access to, the child.

Small claims court may order such parents to compensate those suffering any loss or damage intentionally caused by their child, unless the parent was exercising reasonable supervision over the child at the time the child engaged in the activity that caused the loss or damage and made reasonable efforts to prevent or discourage the child from engaging in the kind of activity that resulted in the loss or damage.

== In U.S. law ==
There is a political movement for greater parental accountability, following of a number of highly publicized violent crimes committed by children. While all U.S. states allow parents to be sued for the various actions of their children, the idea of criminal legislation to enable the prosecution of adults for “neglectful” parenting is relatively new. For example, a number of states have enacted or proposed laws that will:

- automatically hold parents financially responsible for all expenses associated with a second false bomb threat or 911 call made by a child;
- impose a prison term of up to 18 months and order payment of restitution to any victims if the child commits a serious crime;
- imposes a fine and/or a prison term if a child uses a gun owned by the parent to commit a crime;
- fine and/or imprison parents whose children fail to attend school or skip school more than 10 times in a year.

Such legislation is constitutionally problematic in that it is often both broad and vague, and may very well infringe upon the privacy of the family. The sponsors of these laws argue that parental delinquency is usually the cause of the juvenile delinquency, but opponents argue that there is little evidence to support the claim that youth crime is caused by “bad parenting” and that there are many other social, cultural and economic causes that should be addressed. Opponents argue that the increased work hours and multiple jobs that a growing number of parents must take to provide for their families' basic needs decreases their ability to supervise their child(ren), thus creating an injustice with regard to the parents' culpability in the child's action. In 1988, California enacted the Street Terrorism and Prevention Act, which provides for prison sentences of up to one year and fines up to $2,500 for parents who “grossly” or “culpably” deviate from the “normal” standards of supervision. The Supreme Court of California later upheld the constitutionality of this act.
