= Five Sisters window =

Grisaille window in York Minster

Five Sisters window, York Minster
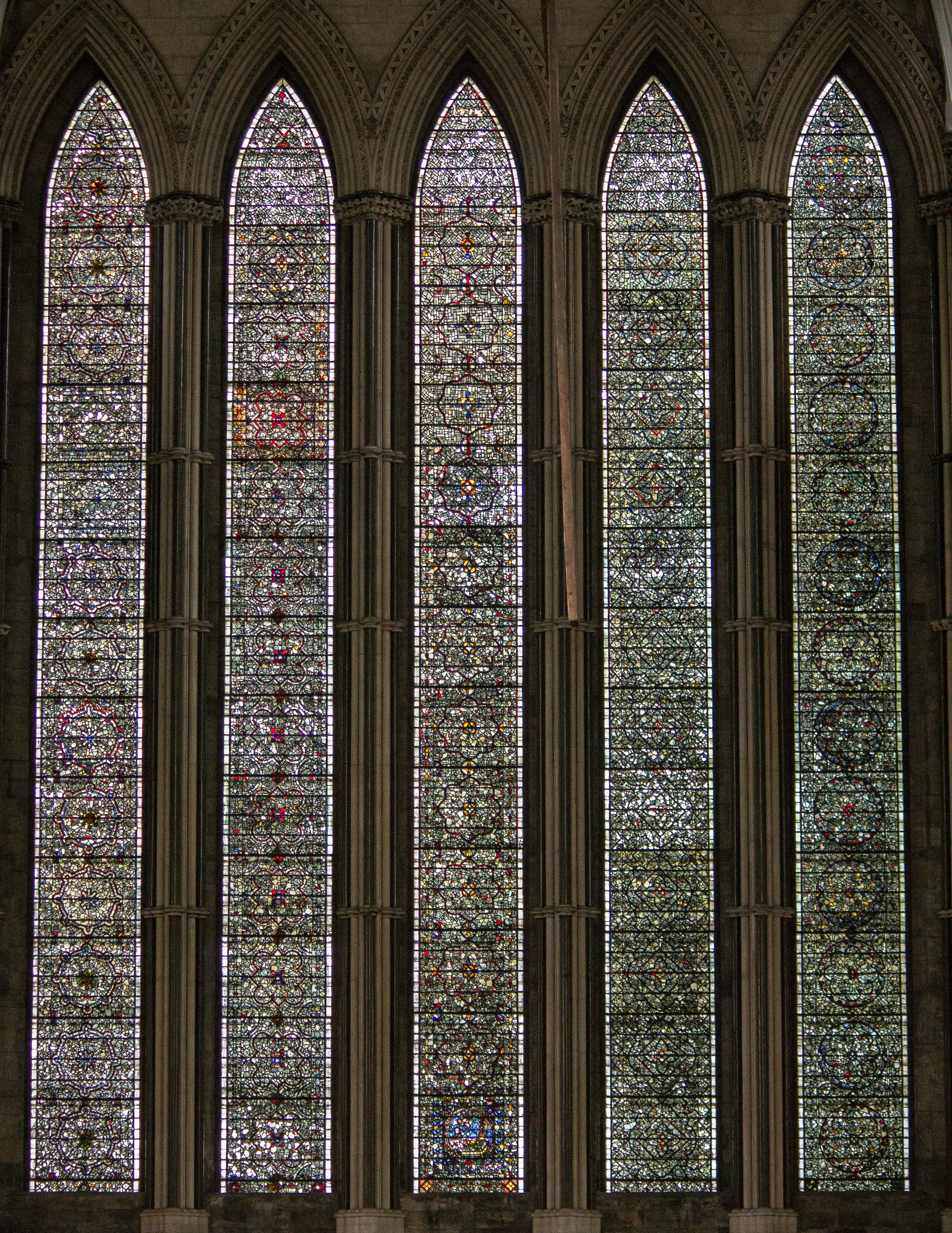
- Year: c. 1250–1260
- Medium: Stained glass
- Dimensions: 16.31 m × 1.56 m (642 in × 61 in)
- Location: York, England

York Minster's Five Sisters window contains the largest expanse of 13th century grisaille glass in the world. It was built c. 1250–1260 and is located in the north wall of the north transept of York Minster. The window features in the Guinness Book of Records as "the largest ancient stained-glass window in the British Isles."

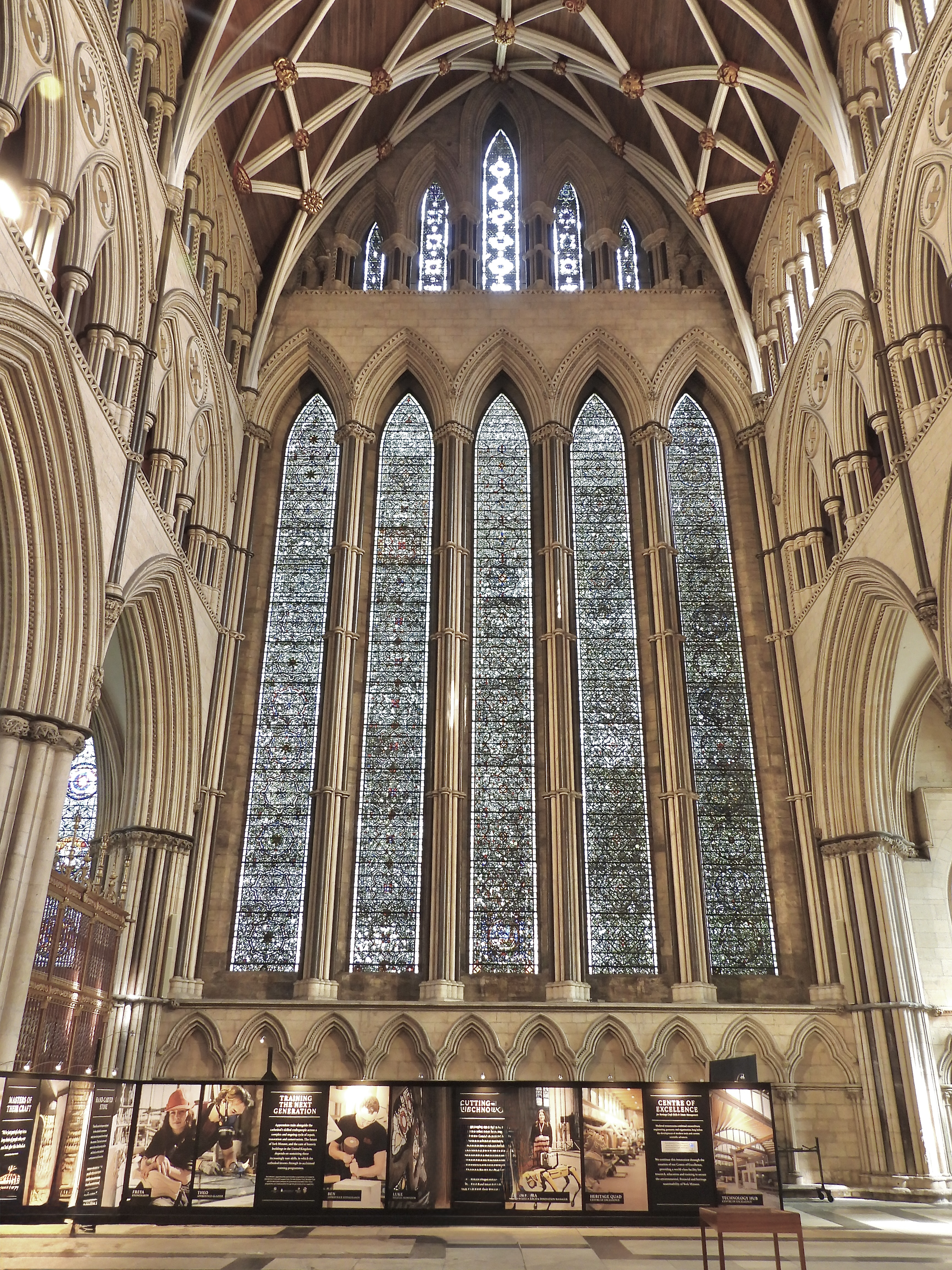
The Famous Five Sisters Window.

The window was restored between 1923 and 1925 and rededicated to all the women of the British Empire who were killed in the line of duty during World War I. It is the only memorial in the UK dedicated to these women.

== Name and story ==
It is not known where the name Five Sisters originates. It first appeared in print in Francis Drake's 1736 Eboracum; or the History and Antiquities of the City of York. It is possible that it is a corruption of Five Cistercians. There is also a legend of five women working the design into a tapestry. An article in a 1950 newspaper begins the story with "Centuries ago there lived at a house called Calais Wold, not far from Bishop Wilton, in the Pocklington area, five sisters, each of whom made a tapestry."

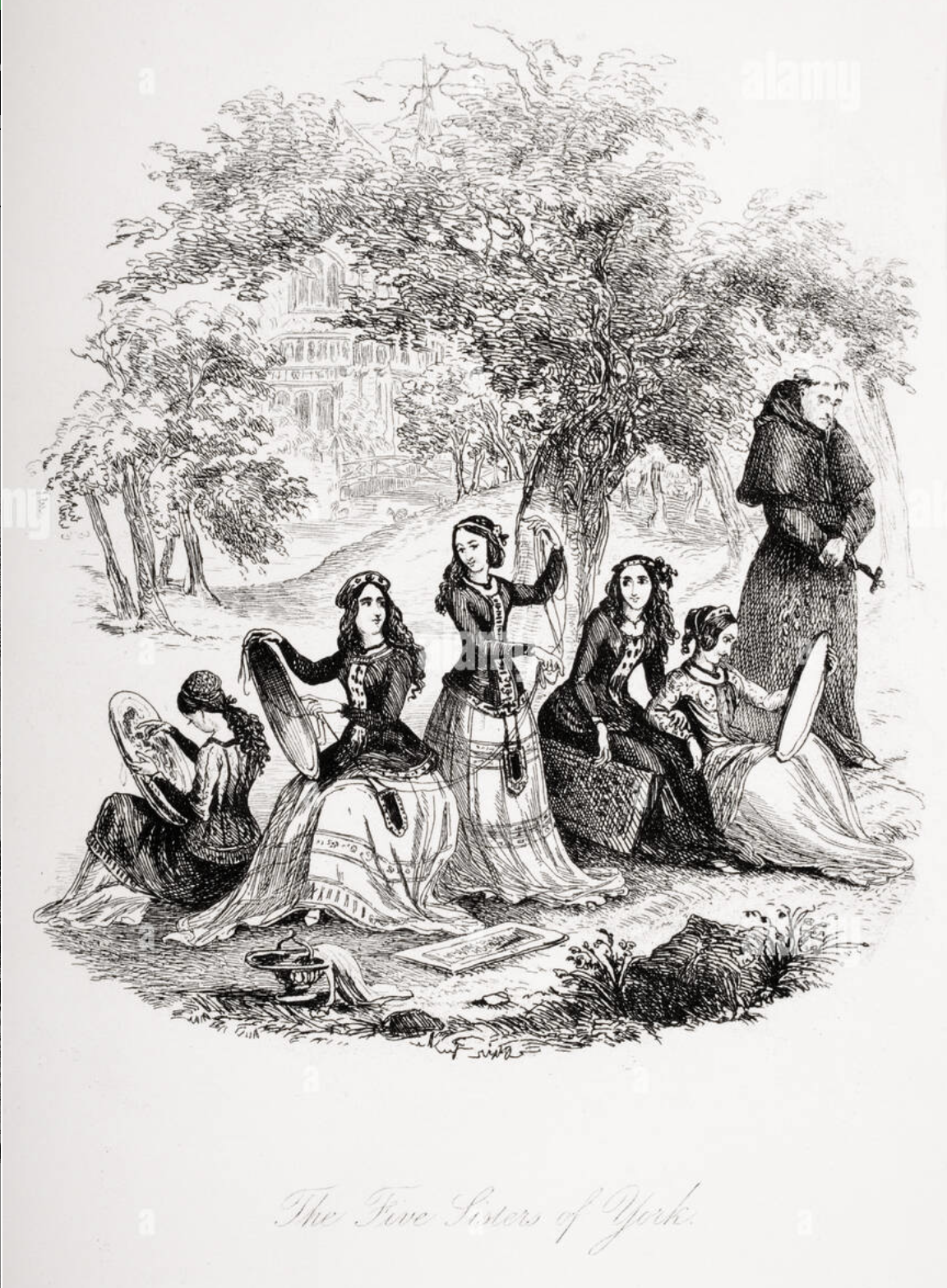
Five Sisters illustration by Phiz from Dickens' Nicholas Nickleby

Charles Dickens included the legend The Five Sisters of York in chapter six of Nicholas Nickleby with five sisters all working on embroideries. He wrote that "the device was of a complex and intricate description, and the pattern and the colours of all five were the same." At the end of the story, after one of the sisters had died, "they sent abroad to artists of great celebrity in those times, and... caused to be executed in five large compartments of richly stained glass a faithful copy of their old embroidery work." The story was illustrated by Hablot Knight Browne, better known as Phiz.

== Design ==
The design consists of five lights featuring a grisaille design comprising 100,000 pieces of glass. Each light measures 16.31 m (53 ft 6 in) high and 1.56 m (5 ft 1 in) wide, separated by columns of stone and Purbeck marble, with foliaged capitals. The design includes clusters of grapes and leaves, together with some early examples of "embryonic naturalistic leaf forms". The pattern is "an elaborate but restrained arrangement of the foliage of the Planta Benedicta (herb Bennet)". The plain border surrounding the glass was inserted in 1715.

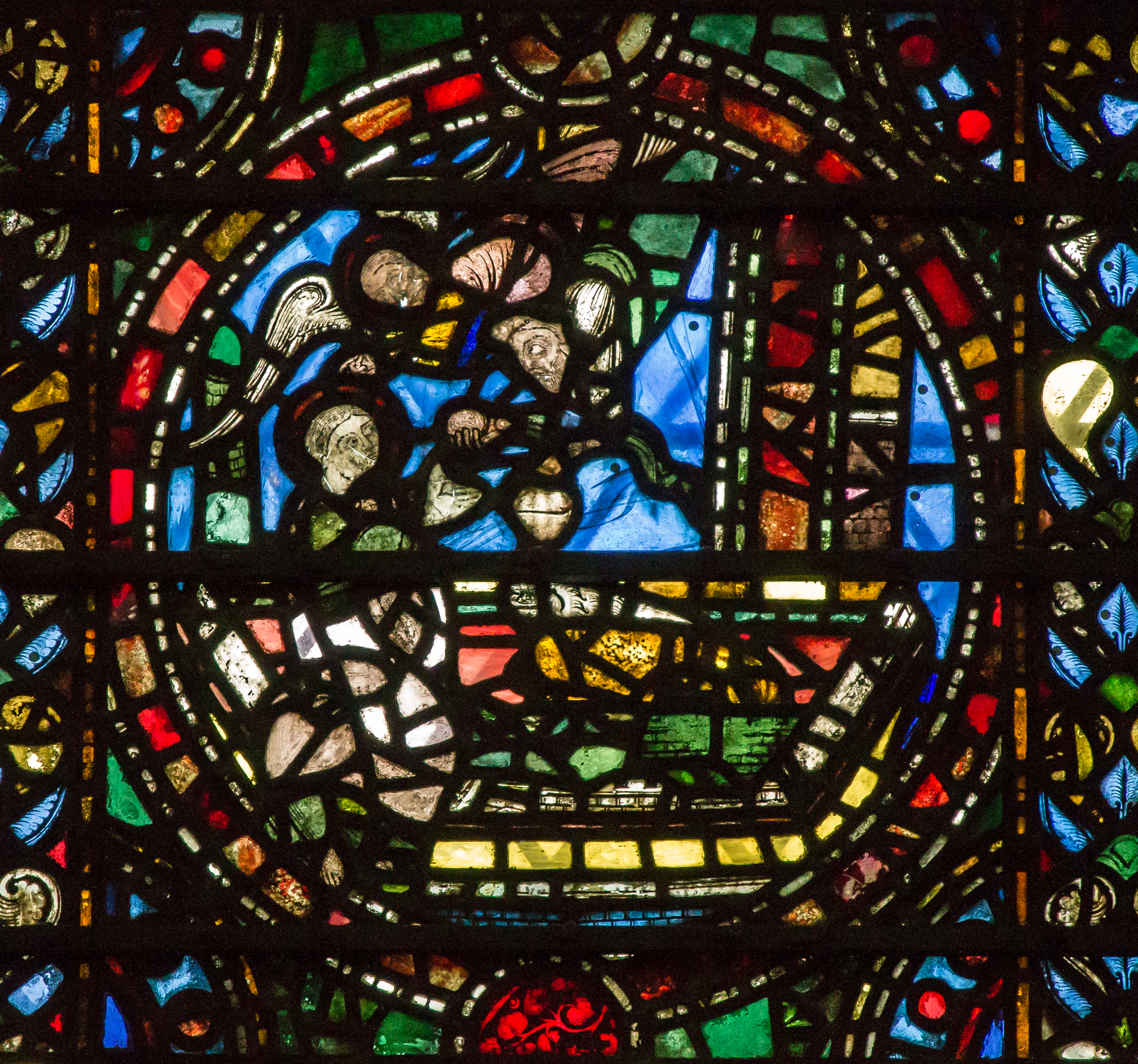
Habbakuk feeding Daniel in the lions' den

At the bottom of the central light is one panel of earlier Norman glass (c.1180), showing Habbakuk feeding Daniel in the lions' den. The design includes ivy, symbolising love and sacrifice, and maple, symbolising victory. It probably came from a medallion window and was most likely moved into the Five Sisters window during the 17th century.

== History ==
The Five Sisters were built c. 1250-70. Their creation was funded in part by York's Jewish community, notably the wealthy Aaron of York, leading to the windows being called "the Jewish window".

In the 16th century, upkeep of the Five Sisters was financed by Cross Keys Farm, an estate belonging to the Church of York. The windows were spared destruction under Oliver Cromwell because Yorkshire-born Lord Thomas Fairfax, Cromwell's Parliamentary General, issued an order that "the man who damaged the windows [of York Minster] would be shot at sight."

In 1791 and 1793, William Peckitt of York, an enamel glass painter, made some repairs to the windows.

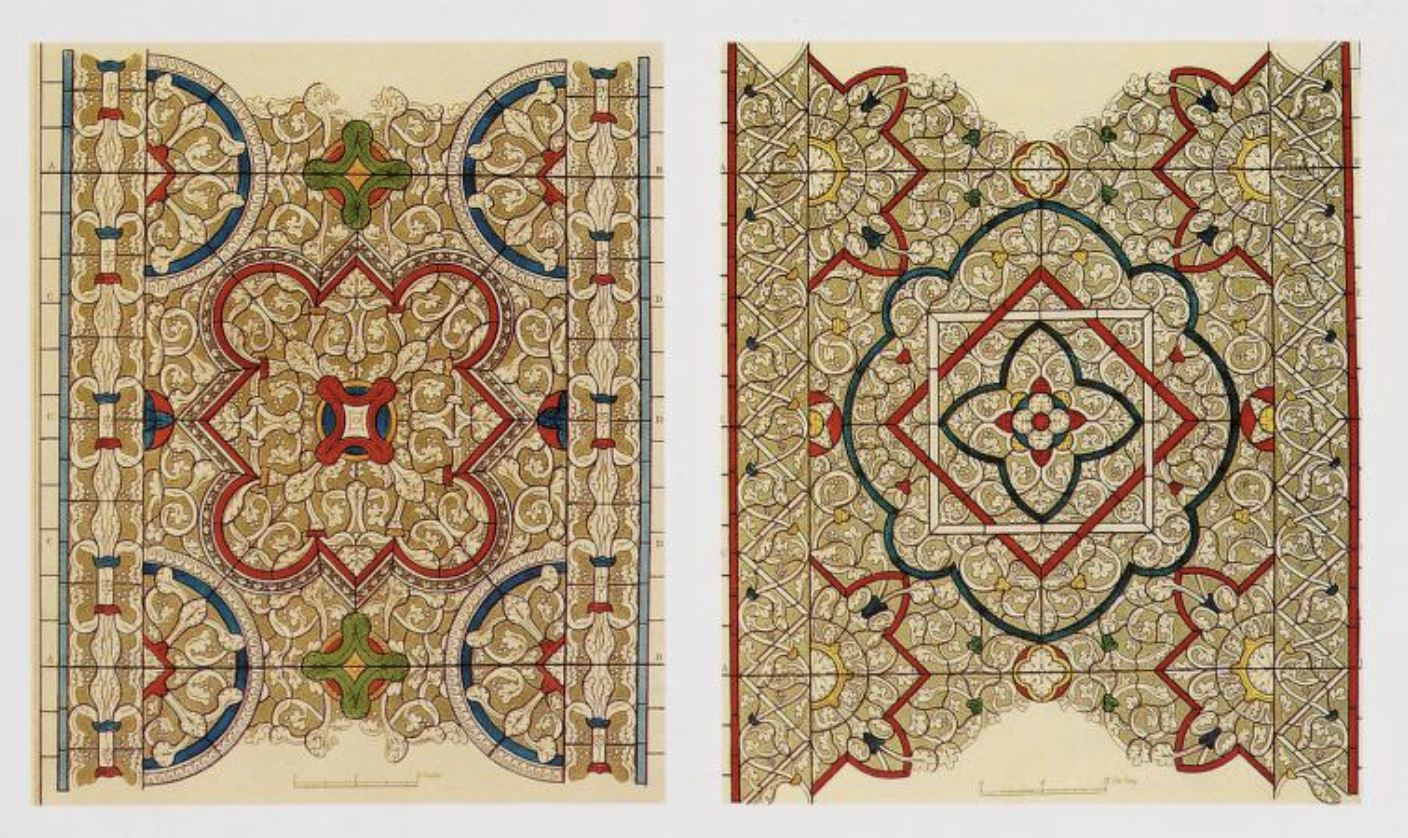
John Browne's coloured drawings of the Five Sisters (1847)

In 1847, York Minster's historian, John Browne, published contemporary coloured drawings of the windows, before the impact of dirt and corrosion discoloured them.

In 1907, during renovation of the Minster, overseen by George Frederick Bodley RA, it was discovered that a layer of plain green glass, which had been added to protect the windows, had cracked, together with the surrounding stonework. The protective glass was replaced in 1908, with the Builder's Journal and Architectural Engineer writing that "It would be dangerous and, indeed, impossible to attempt to touch the ancient glass itself. It is too fragile, but it can be thoroughly protected and preserved from further decay."

=== World War I ===
In 1916, during a German zeppelin raid, a bomb fell near the Minster. It caused no damage but prompted wholesale removal of the Minster's windows as a precaution. They were stored in the cellars of various country houses near York. During their removal, it was discovered that tiny holes had developed in the glass of the Five Sisters, which, as they grew, were causing the glass to "scale off" until only a thin shell of colour remained. This meant that the windows were in urgent need of full restoration.

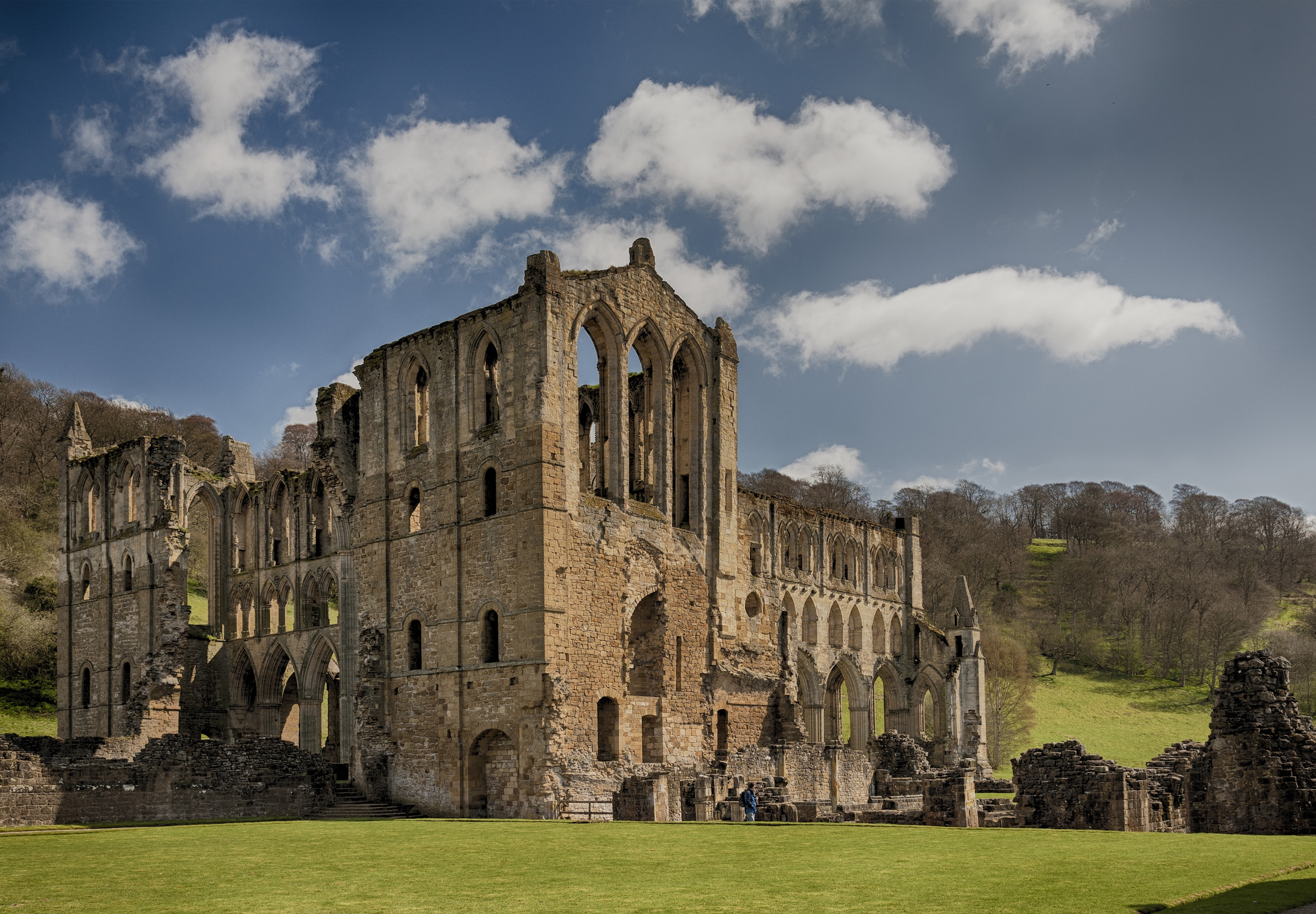
Rievaulx Abbey

The lead holding the glass in place was also in poor condition and needed urgent repair. The owner of ruined 13th century Rievaulx Abbey in the North Riding of Yorkshire donated lead that had been stripped from the abbey's windows and stored sometime after the dissolution of the monasteries, bearing the stamp of Henry VIII.

== Becoming a memorial ==
Mrs Helen Drage Little, widow of Colonel Charles Blakeway Little, had seen first-hand the efforts of women during World War I. While in Egypt she had seen wounded soldiers arriving from Gallipoli, about whose carers she wrote, "I was witness to the untiring devotion under great difficulties of the nurses and other women who gave themselves up, entirely regardless of their own health, in some cases with fatal results, to alleviate the suffering of the men." After the war, she noted that "when memorials on all sides were being erected to our brothers, I often thought that our sisters who also made the same sacrifice appeared to have been forgotten."

In November 1921, Little wrote a letter, instructing that it be printed in The Times after her death, recording a dream she had had involving the Five Sisters window. In the letter, she described entering the Quire at York Minster and seeing two young children in the centre of the North Transept, beckoning and pointing towards the window. "I moved towards them and then recognised my two little sisters, both of whom had died as children. As I followed the little pointing finger, I saw the window move slowly backwards as if on hinges, revealing the most exquisite garden with wondrous flowers I had never seen before." Little noted that the garden was filled with women, and, as they approached, the window slowly swung closed, waking Little from her dream, and causing her to cry out "The Sisters' Window for the Sisters".

=== Fundraising efforts ===
In 1922 Little and Almyra Gray, a suffragist, former president of the National Council for Women Workers, local magistrate and social reformer, launched an appeal to raise £3,000 from "Yorkshire women" towards the restoration of the Five Sisters window before they were returned to the Minster. She proposed its dedication in memory of "the brave women who laid down their lives in the service of their country", most of whom were nurses. Consent was given for the dedication by the Minster's Dean and Chapter, and by the Army, Navy, civilian nurses, VADs, WAACs, WRNs and Stewardesses.

Within nine weeks of launching the appeal 32,000 women from far beyond just Yorkshire, from across Britain and the Empire, had donated £3,500. Donors ranged from "Princess Mary (£50) to the widow, who, at considerable personal sacrifice, sent her whole week's pension". A booklet published to mark the rededication read "Princess Mary's keen interest thus directly...helped in a very great degree to bring about the swift response to the Appeal." In it Little made special mention of the female transport drivers "who went right up to the firing-line and the stewardesses who stuck to their posts."

Cities from the North of England also financially supported the restoration: bronze plaques under the window of the Minster's Choir record that Carlisle, Durham, Chester, Ripon, Manchester and Liverpool all contributed to the cost. Florence Bell wrote a pageant play, The Heart of Yorkshire, as part of the fundraising effort.

In 1922, while speaking at a fundraising meeting, the Dean of York revealed that, the previous year, a 30"x 30" panel of 14th century English stained glass had sold at auction for £18,500. From this, he extrapolated that the glass of York Minster was worth "about £73,000,000" [equivalent to £3.3 billion in 2023].

== Restoration and dedication ==
Having secured sufficient funds, the Five Sisters were restored between 1923 and 1925, overseen by the Minster's consulting architect, Walter Tapper.

After being reinstated, the newly restored windows were unveiled by the Duchess of York at a dedication service on 24 June 1925, together with an inscription reading, "Sacred to the memory of the women of the Empire who gave their lives in the European war of 1914–1918". The service was attended by 800 relatives of the women whose service was being commemorated, together with representatives from all branches of women's war services. Before the unveiling, the Duchess said,

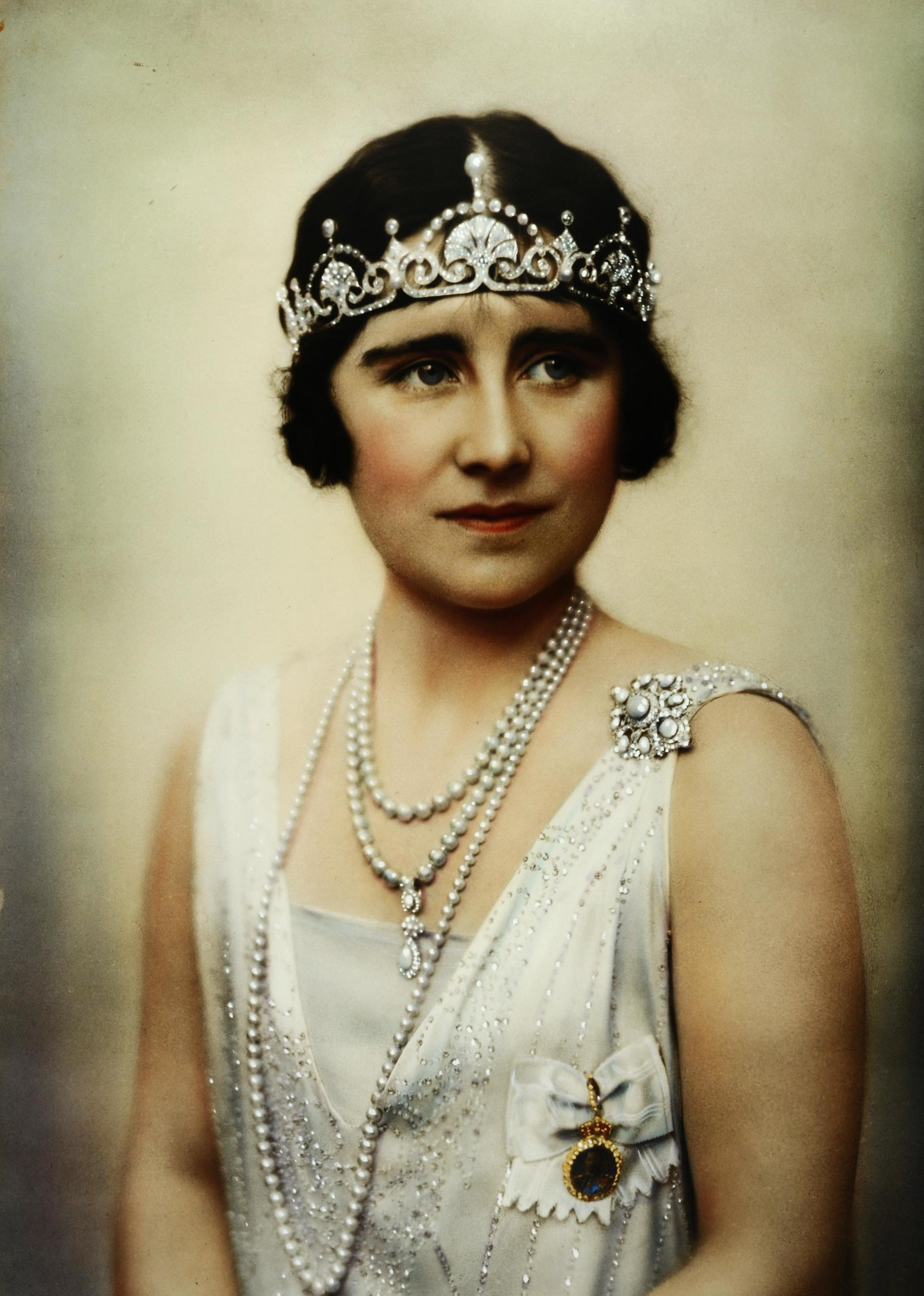
Duchess of York, 1925

"As an act of most high praise and glad thanksgiving to Almighty God for the lives and devotion of the 1,400 women of the Empire who died for their country in the war, now, in the name of their sisters in all parts of the world, I unveil and restore to its ancient use the Five Sisters Window."

Immediately following the unveiling, a prayer was said, including "John Romain [who had overseen the restoration] and all those who laboured with him". At the end of the service, a guard of honour was composed of 70 female VADs from the North Riding of Yorkshire British Red Cross and 50 Girl Guides.

Various National Councils of Women from across the British Empire also held services at the same time, or as close as possible to the time of the dedication, including in Toronto, Winnipeg, Adelaide, and locations in Tasmania, South Africa and New Zealand.

=== The screens ===
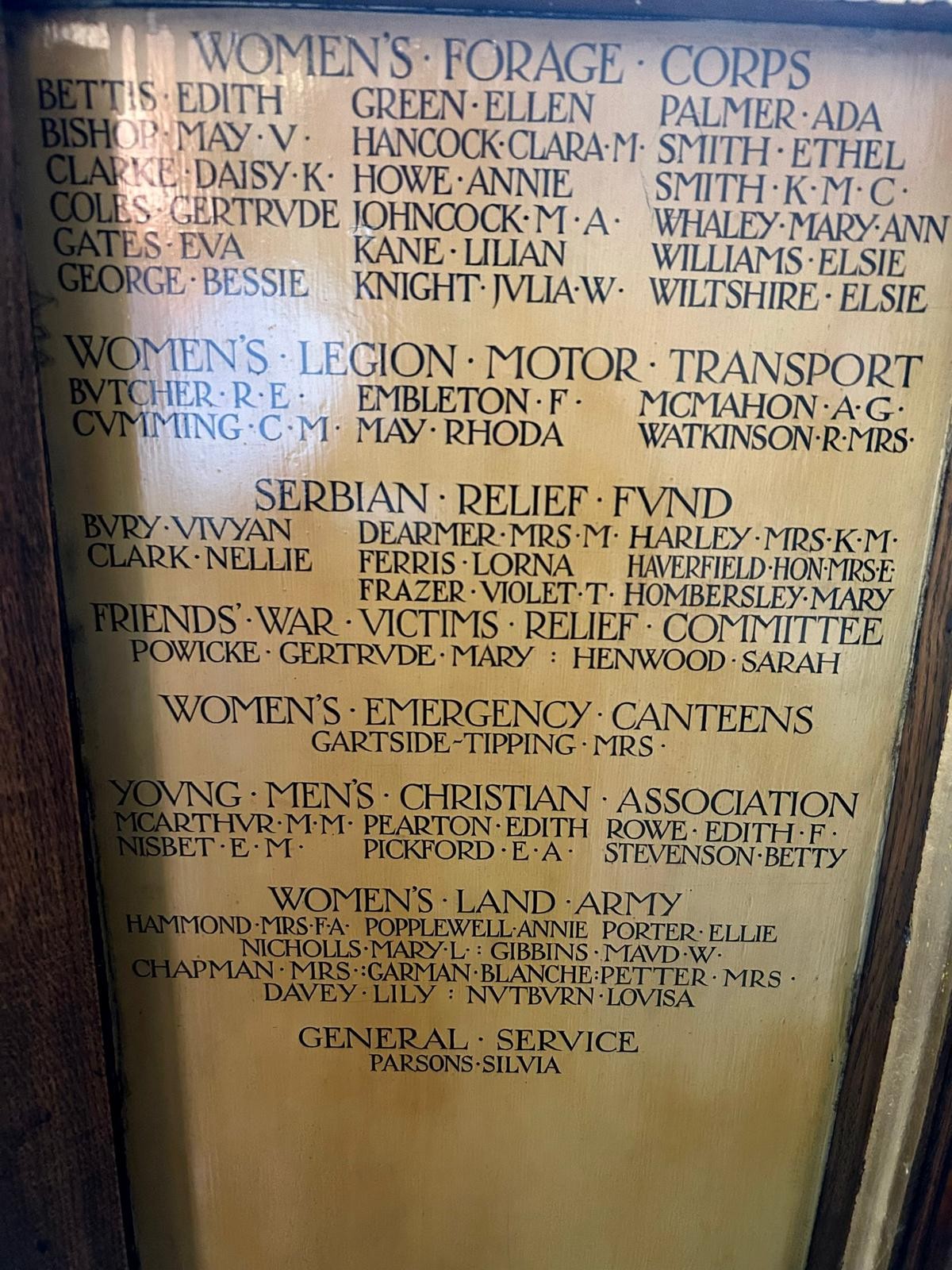
A screen from St Nicholas Chapel, York Minster

With excess funds from Little and Gray's fundraising efforts ten oak screens, designed by Tapper, were added to the north side of the St Nicholas Chapel. They list the name of every woman who died in the line of service during World War I. Although not initially part of the memorial plan, the screens were commissioned using excess money from the fundraising efforts. An inscription thereon reads, "This screen records the names of women of the Empire who gave their lives in the war 1914–1918 to whose memory the Five Sisters window was restored by women" and which Little called a "Roll of honour of the Empire's female dead."

== The women ==
There are 1,513 names listed on the screens, including Edith Cavell and Mabel Milne. Little and Grey went to "great lengths to compile as full a list as possible of the dead, corresponding with numerous government departments in Britain and in the Dominions." The women are listed as serving in the following organisations, with the insignias of each service included:

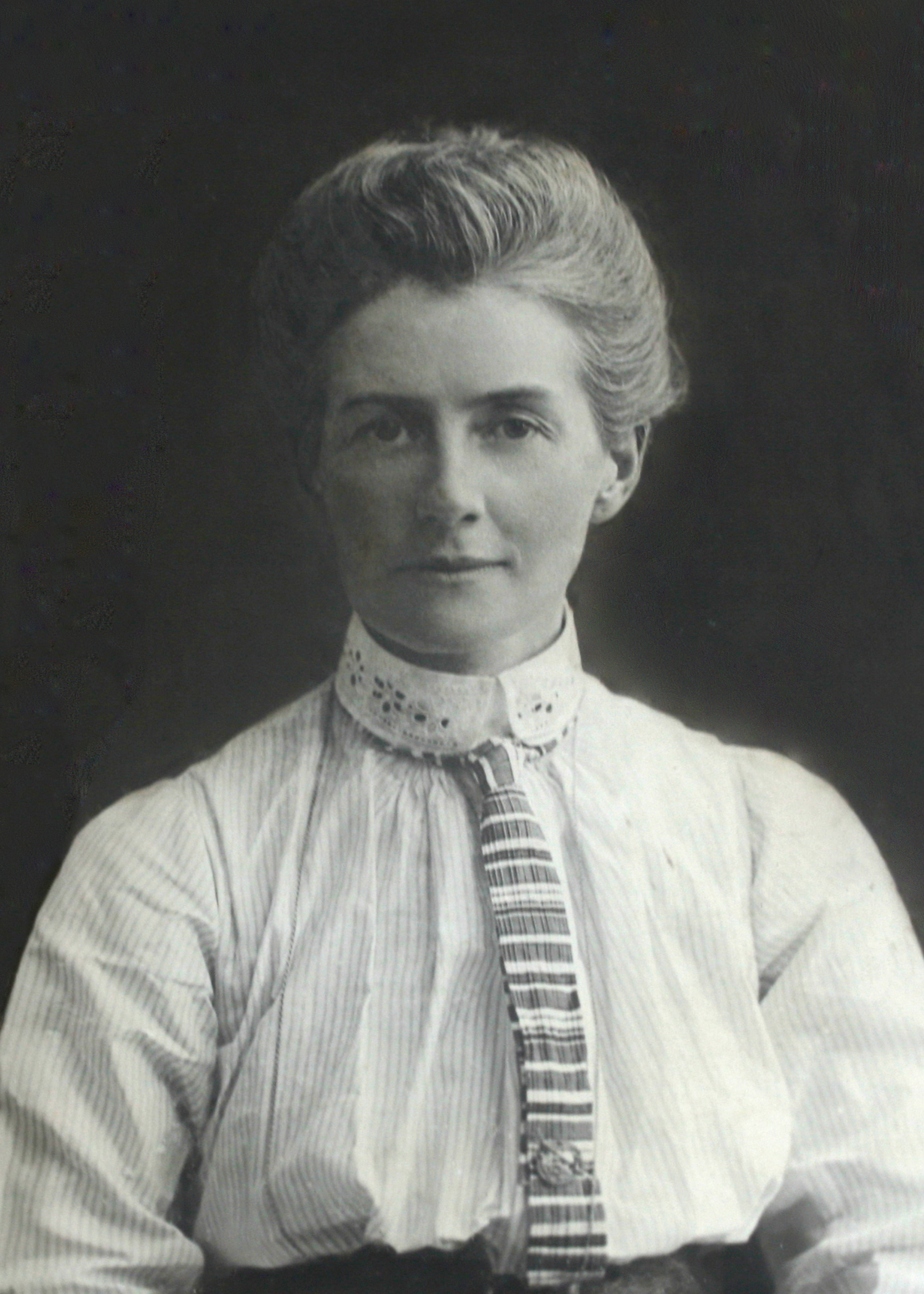
Edith Cavill (1865–1915)

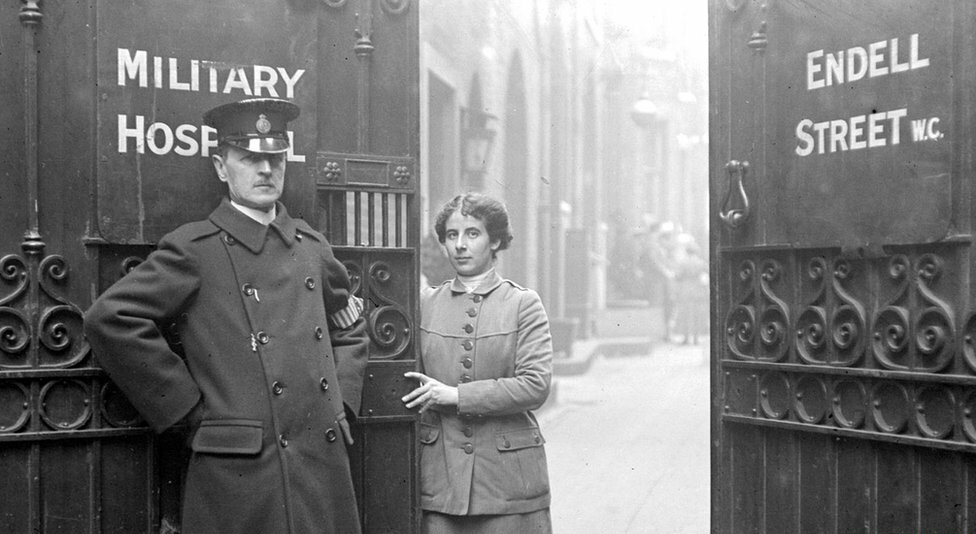
Endell Street Military Hospital

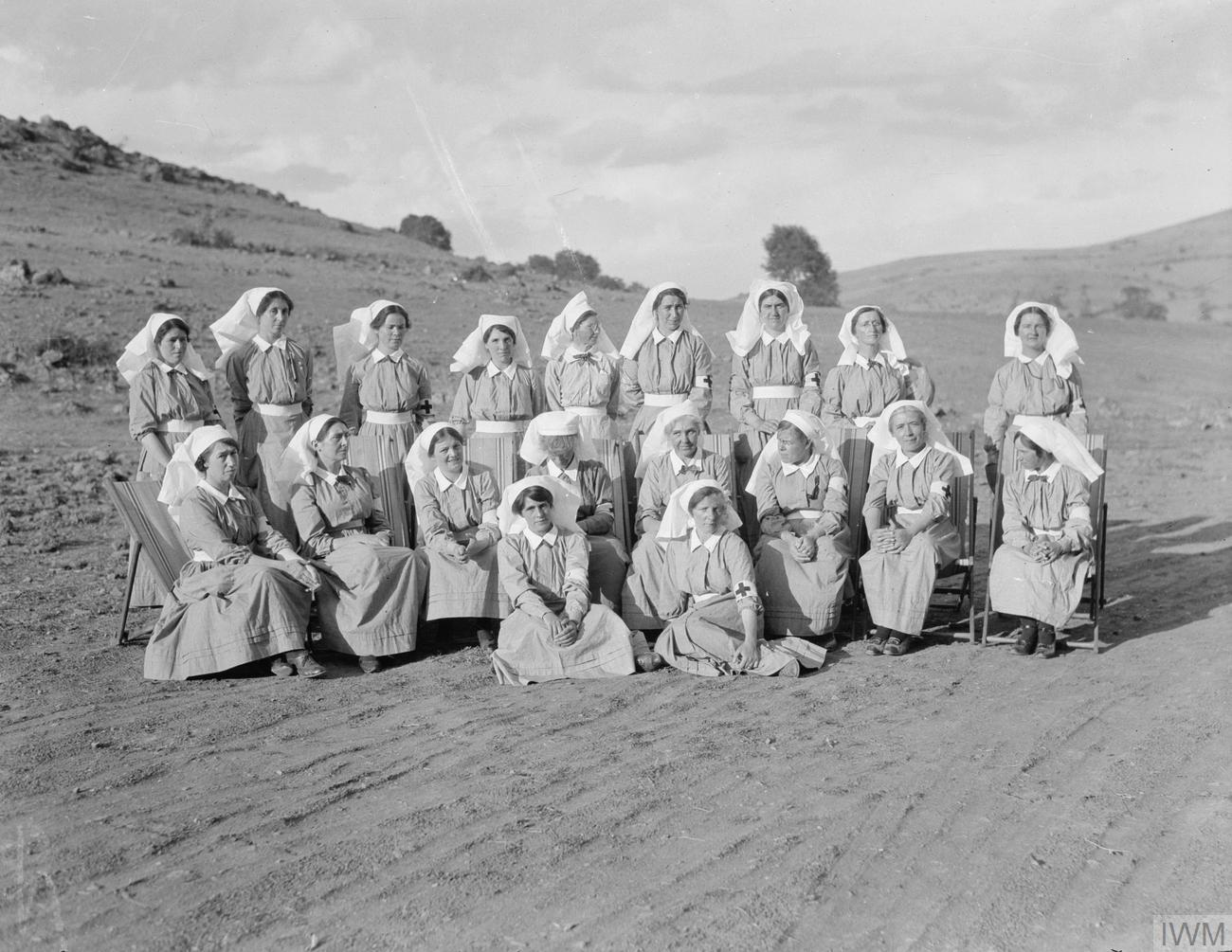
Scottish Women's Hospitals

- Australian Army Nursing Service
- Australian Red Cross Society
- Auxiliary Hospitals
- British Committee of the French Red Cross
- Canadian Army Nursing Service
- Colonial Nursing Association
- Endell Street Military Hospital
- Friends War Victims Relief Committee
- General Service
- Medical Women
- Members of Voluntary Aid Detachments
- Mercantile Marine Stewardesses
- Munitions workers
- New Zealand Army Nursing Service
- Order of Saint John and the British Red Cross
- Queen Alexandra's Imperial Military Nursing Service
- Queen Alexandra's Imperial Military Nursing Service for India
- Queen Alexandra's Royal Naval Nursing Service
- Queen Mary's Army Auxiliary Corps
- Scottish Women's Hospitals
- Serbian Relief Fund
- Union of South Africa Army Nursing Service
- Women's Emergency Canteens
- Women's Forage Corps
- Women's Land Army
- Women's Legion Motor Transport
- Women's Royal Naval Service
- Women's Royal Air Force
- YMCA

== After 1925 ==
In 1935, there was an infestation of deathwatch beetle in the roof of the transept over the Five Sisters window. During extensive repairs the windows were boarded up.

=== World War II ===
The windows were once more removed and placed underground in 1939 at the outbreak of World War II. The 20 panels required "over 20 huge packing cases" for storage.

=== After World War II ===
Before being reinstated the windows required further restoration, which was part of an effort to make safe the entire west front of the Minster, to avoid its being "permanently defaced by gantries, erected as a necessary protection to passers-by against stones falling as they crumble away". This effort would cost £250,000 (equivalent to £6.8 million in 2023). In June 1950, in reference to fundraising for the Five Sisters window, the Dean of the Minster was quoted as saying, "We have been anxious that it should be the work of the women of Yorkshire and England, as it was after the First War." In 1950 they were reinstated, using an eight-storey electric lift.

York Minster's first all-female bell ringing team

A rededication service was held on 9 December 1950, attended by 2,400 people, involving a massed choir of 250 singers and a choir of one hundred singers representing the Women's Institute. For the first time, an all-female team of bell-ringers, from the Ladies Guild of Change Ringers, rang the Minster's bells for the service.

Another Minster first was the inclusion of the craftspeople who had been responsible for the restoration work playing a formal role in the rededication service. Mr W J Green, the Clerk of Works, whose father had been responsible for preserving and replacing the glass after World War I, was asked by the Dean, "Can your glaziers assure me that, despite its age, the glass is in good order and has been replaced without hurt?" to which Mr O. Lazenby, the glazier foreman, replied, "In the name of the Minster glaziers, I, whose responsibility it has been to superintend the insertion of the five windows, do testify that it has been well and truly done." This dialogue was intended to draw attention to the glaziers' skill and their devotion to this enormous task.

The scaffolding was fully removed in March 1951, giving the first unobstructed view of the windows since 1935 when work had been carried out to repair damage from the death watch beetle. The windows were subsequently featured as part of the 1951 Festival of Britain. In the same year there was a call to raise funds to re-lead the roof over the windows.

In 1964 twenty panes were shot by an air rifle.

During an exploratory analysis of the window's glass by the University of York's physics department during the 1970s it was discovered that three pieces of blue glass were medieval soda glass, rather than the expected potash glass. Prior to this it was thought that almost all medieval stained glass in Europe contained potash, meaning that this discovery was "both unexpected and important". After further investigation, it became clear that Medieval blue soda glass was not as rare as had been suspected, and that York Minster had at least ten times as much as was initially thought.

== See also ==
- List of Canadian nurses who died in World War I
- List of nurses who died in World War I
