= Helen Drage Little =

English fundraiser (1871-1933)

- Born: Helen Drage Beckwith; 1871; Winchester, England
- Died: 8 November 1933; York
- Spouse: Charles Blakeway Little (m. 1899)

Helen Drage Little (1871 - 8 Nov 1933) led a successful fundraising campaign in 1922 to restore the Five Sisters window of York Minster and have it dedicated to the women of the British Empire who died in the line of service during World War I.

== Personal life ==
Helen Drage Beckwith was born to Rev. George and Emily Jane Beckwith in Winchester, Hampshire in 1871. She had a younger brother Arthur. At least two sisters died in infancy. She married Colonel Charles Blakeway Little of Somerset Light Infantry at Winchester Cathedral on 10 January 1899. She died at St Peter's Grove, York.

== World War I ==
Little was in Cairo when the first trainloads of wounded arrived from Gallipoli. She wrote that she "was witness to the untiring devotion under great difficulties of the nurses and other women who gave themselves up, entirely regardless of their own health, in some cases with fatal results, to alleviate the suffering of the men." After the war, she noted that "when memorials on all sides were being erected to our brothers, I often thought that our sisters who also made the same sacrifice appeared to have been forgotten."

== Five Sisters window, York Minster ==
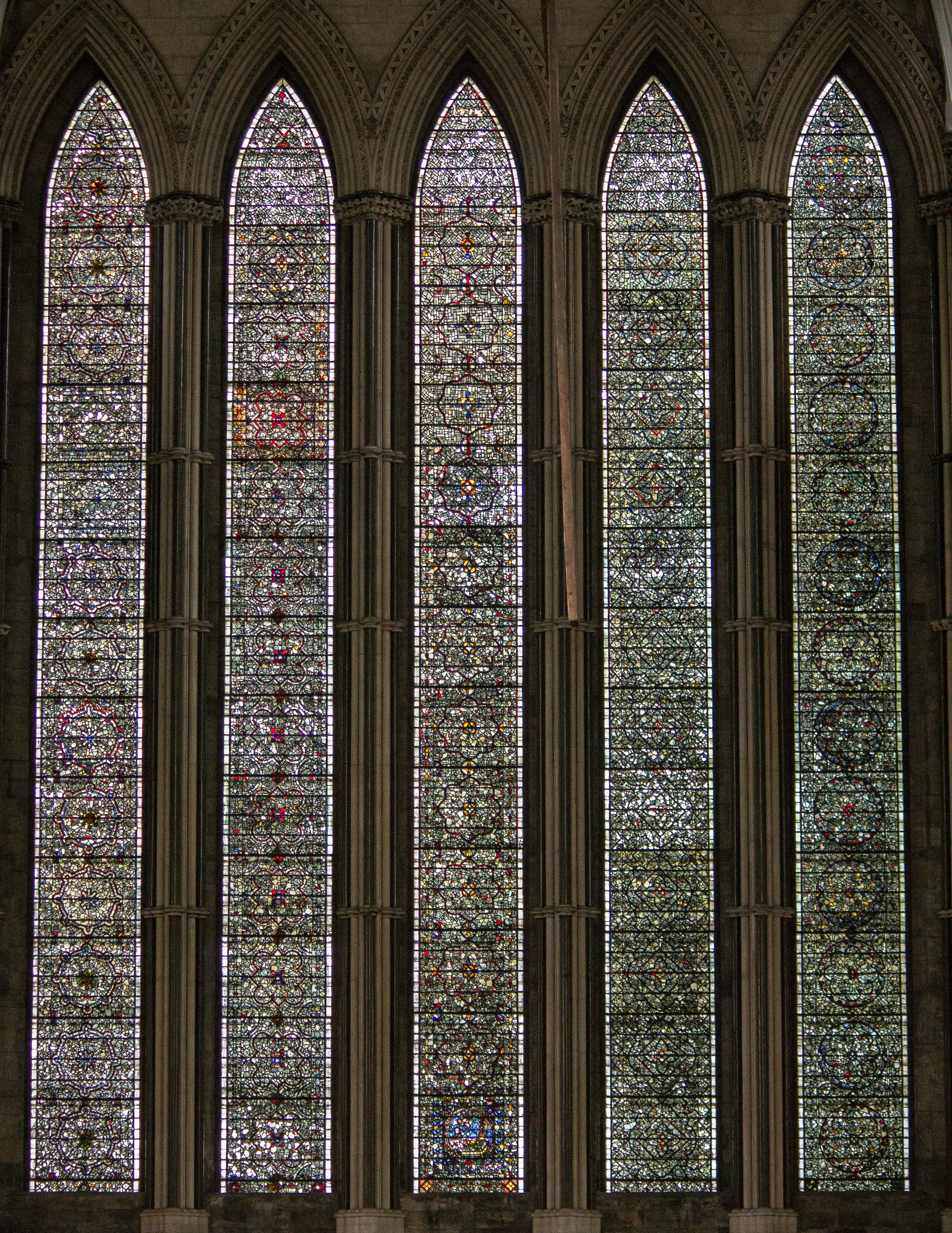
The Five Sisters window, York Minster

Little first visited York Minster in 1909. She said the Five Sisters window, "in its quaint simplicity, quiet dignity", had made a lasting impression on her.

=== Little's vision ===
On 30 November 1922 Little had a vision. She detailed it in a letter which was published posthumously in The Times. In her vision she was in the Minster and saw two of her sisters, who had both died in infancy, pointing towards the Five Sisters window. It then moved, as if on hinges, to reveal a garden behind it. In the garden was a tree under which sat five women, all weaving. In the distance girls and women "came gliding up the garden in misty grey-blue garments." The window then swung back into place with her sisters both still pointing at it. She woke up and cried out "The Sisters Window for the sisters."

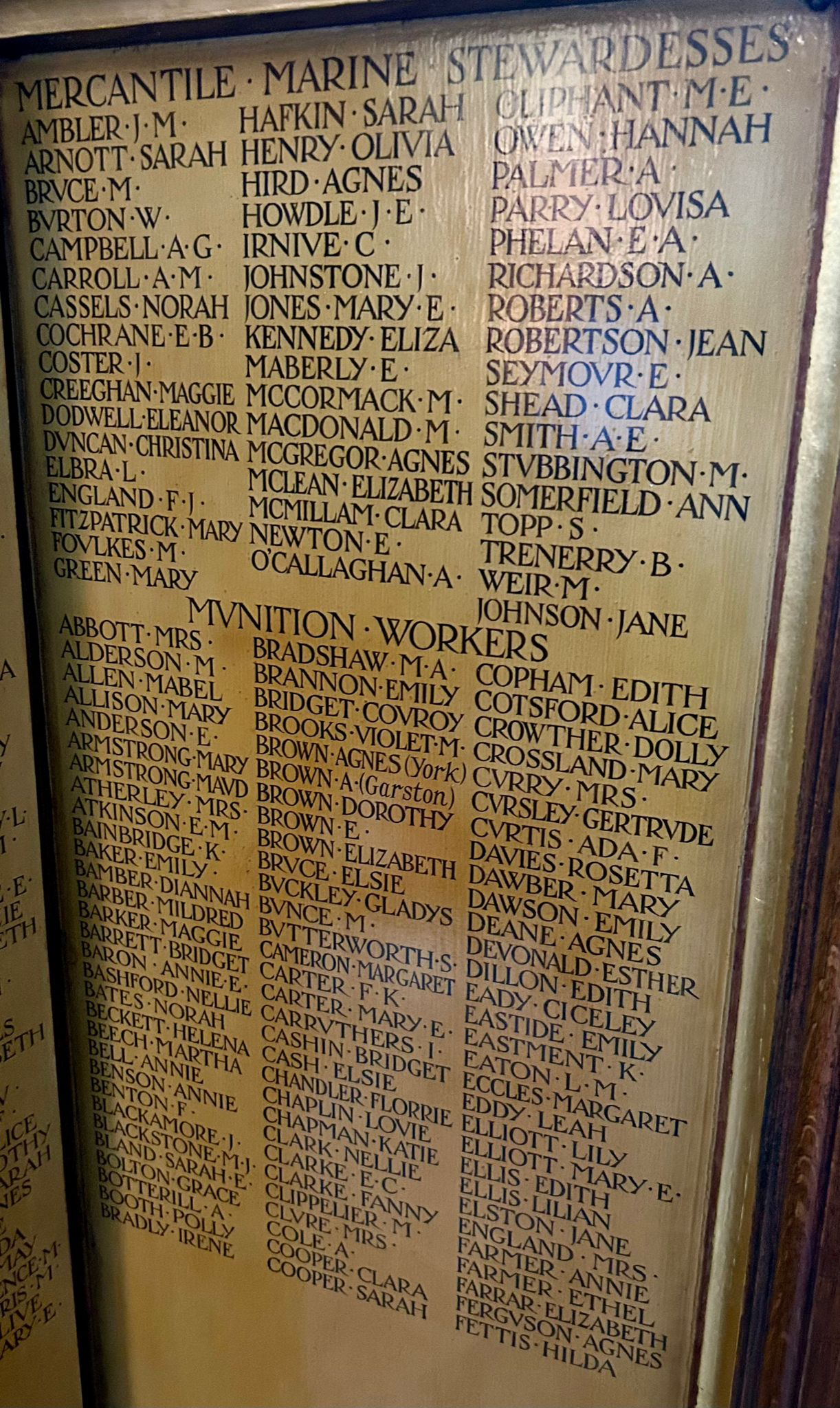
Oak panel listing women that died in munitions factories in WWI

This vision led Little to propose that the restoration of the Five Sisters window be completed in memory of the women of the Empire who gave their lives in service during WWI. (During the war the Minster's windows were removed for safety, when it was discovered they were in need of significant restoration.) The Dean immediately accepted her proposal and fundraising efforts began.

Little was the joint honourable secretary, together with Almyra Gray, for the fundraising effort for the Five Sisters window memorial. Within nine weeks, 32,000 people had donated a total of £3,500 (equivalent to £165,000 in 2024). The window was reinstalled, together with ten oak panels listing the names of all the women who died in the line of service, and the dedication service was held in June 1925.

=== After Little's death ===
The first part of Little's funeral took place at York Minster's Chapel of St Nicholas (which also forms part of the memorial). It was attended by the Yorkshire School for the Blind, the Voluntary Aid Detachment, the Primrose League, the County Hospital Linen Guild, the National Council of Women Workers and Queen Mary's Army Auxiliary Corps. The subsequent part of the funeral was held in Winchester.

After Little's death the executors of her will donated the archives of the Five Sisters fundraising effort to York Minster's archive.

== Other roles held by Little ==
- Clifton Women's Conservative Association - chair
- Conservative Women's Central Advisory Committee - chair
