= Mabel Milne =

Scottish volunteer nurse who died of wounds during the First World War

Mabel Lee Milne's headstone at Longuenesse (St Omer) Souvenir Cemetery, France

Mabel Lee Milne (8 January 1886 – 2 October 1917) was a Scottish volunteer nurse of the Territorial Force Nursing Service who served in France during the First World War and was fatally wounded during a German air raid on the 58th (Scottish) General Hospital near St Omer. Born in Dundee then lived and was educated in Perth, she trained and worked as a nurse in Edinburgh before volunteering for wartime service. Posted to France in 1917, she was injured during the bombing of her hospital and died two days later; she was subsequently mentioned in Dispatches for gallant and distinguished service. Milne is buried in Longuenesse (St. Omer) Souvenir Cemetery and is commemorated on memorials in Perth, Edinburgh, and York Minster. Her death is recognised as part of the wider history of Scottish women's wartime service and the risks faced by medical personnel during aerial bombardment.

== Early life ==
Milne was born in Dundee, the eldest daughter of James Mitchell Milne, District Traffic Agent for the Caledonian and West Coast Railway, and Mary (Lee) Milne. By 1901 the family had settled at Dunphail, Craigie Road, Perth, where the household included her parents, her brother George, and her sister Maggie. She was educated at Perth Academy, where her name appears on the school's First World War memorial.

== Nursing career ==
Before the First World War, Milne worked at Craigleith Hospital in Edinburgh (now the Western General Hospital). She volunteered for wartime service and joined the Territorial Force Nursing Service. She was posted to France as a Staff Nurse on 29 May 1917, serving with the 58th (Scottish) General Hospital, a major medical centre supporting the British Expeditionary Force.

== Service in France and Death ==
On the night of 30 September / 1 October 1917, German aircraft bombed the hospital complex at St Omer. The attack killed three nurses outright, and wounded three others. Milne sustained severe injuries and died on 2 October 1917, aged 31. The Nursing Times reported the incident in detail, noting the destruction of hospital huts and the high number of casualties among patients and staff.

Milne was later mentioned in Despatches by Field Marshal Sir Douglas Haig for “gallant and distinguished service in the field”. Scottish newspapers described her as “the first Perth lady to make the supreme sacrifice in the War.”

== Burial ==
Milne is buried in Longuenesse (St. Omer) Souvenir Cemetery, France, where her grave is maintained by the Commonwealth War Graves Commission (CWGC). The CWGC archive records later contact from her sister, Mrs Margaret J. Ross, who sought corrections to the headstone as the initials of her name were incorrect, and requested photographs of the grave.

== Commemorations ==
Milne is commemorated on:

- Perth Academy War Memorial;
- Women of the Empire Memorial in York Minster;
- War memorial in Edinburgh,
- Nursing Times Roll of Honour;
- Commonwealth war grave at Longuenesse (St. Omer) Souvenir Cemetery
