= Lancaster Gate Memorial Cross =

War memorial in London

Coordinates: 51.5116°N 0.1802°W

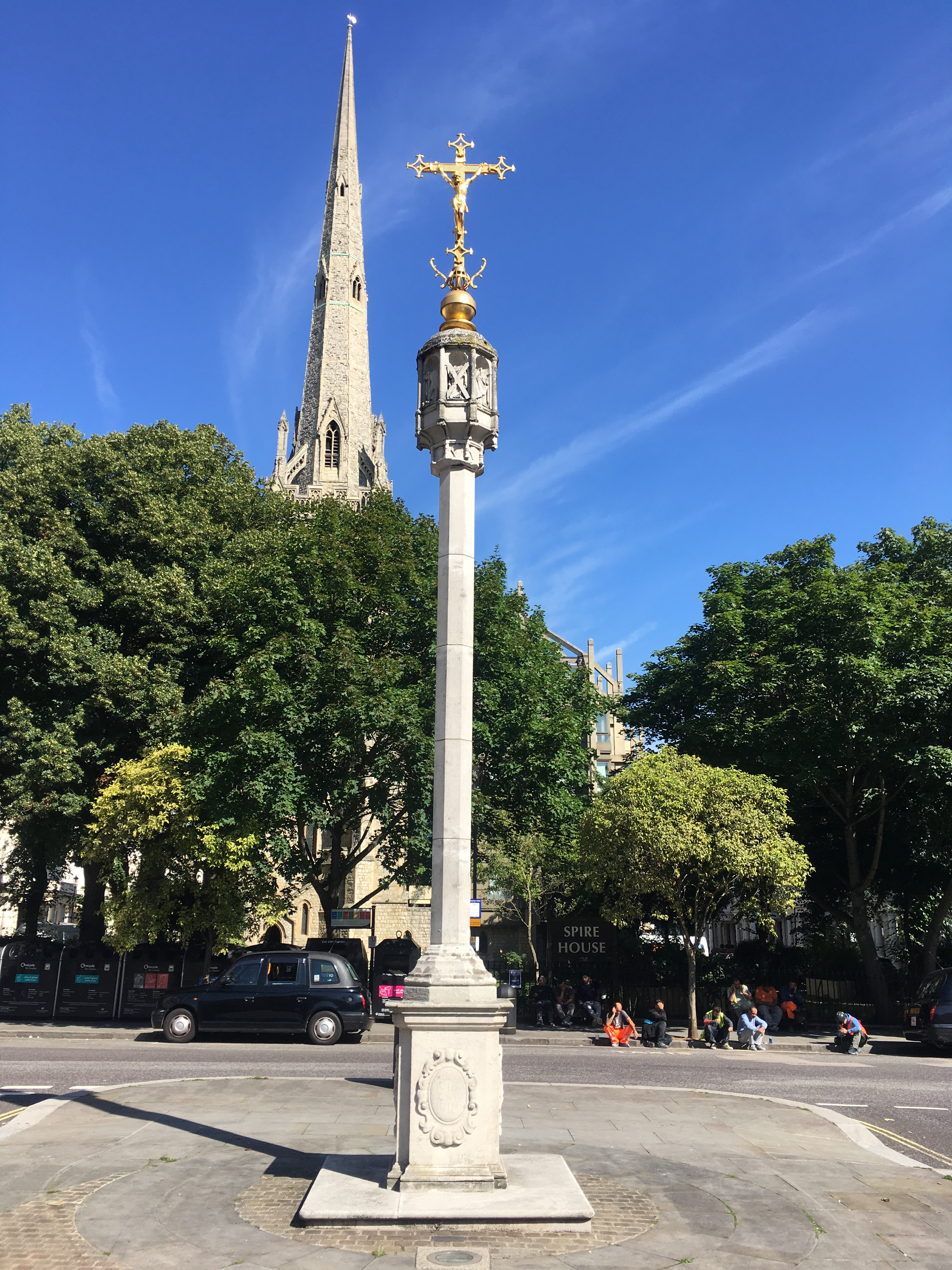
Lancaster Gate Memorial Cross

The Lancaster Gate Memorial Cross is a grade II listed war memorial in Lancaster Gate, London, commemorating residents of the Metropolitan Borough of Paddington who died fighting in the First World War.

The memorial cross was designed by Walter Tapper in the Gothic Revival style and its sculpture was executed by Laurence Arthur Turner. It consists of a column surmounted with a golden cross, below which in eight niches are the figures of Saint George for England, Saint Louis for France, and six of the warrior saints of Christendom: Maurice, Longinus, Victor, Adrian, Florian and Eustace.

The memorial was originally sited on the footpath outside Christ Church and was unveiled on 27 March 1921 by John Maud, the Bishop of Kensington. It was seriously damaged in the Great Storm of 1987 but restored and moved to Lancaster Gate in 2002 as part of the Lancaster Gate street improvement scheme. The restored memorial was unveiled on 11 November (Armistice Day) 2002. In 2016, the first memorial service since then was held at the cross.
