= Church of the Ascension, Malvern Link =

Church of the Ascension
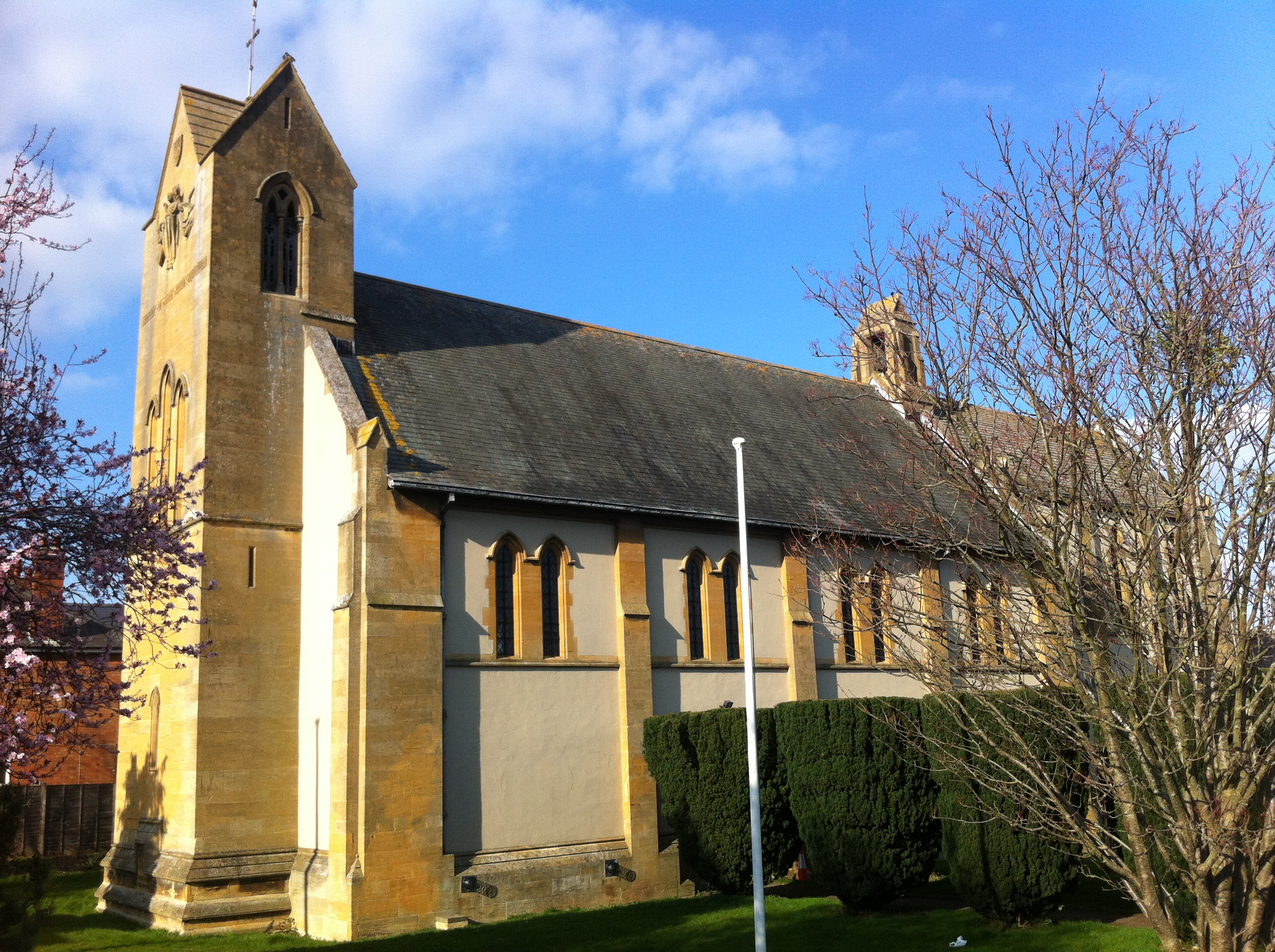
- Church of the Ascension, Malvern Link
- Church of the Ascension
- 52.127969°N 2.331116°W
- OS grid reference: SO 77437 47771
- Location: Malvern Link, Worcestershire
- Country: England
- Denomination: Anglican
- Website: mlwc.church

History
- Founder: Louisa Vavasour Livingstone
- Dedicated: 3 October 1903
- Consecrated: 4 October 1989

Architecture
- Functional status: Active
- Heritage designation: Grade II Listed
- Designated: 20 June 1991
- Architect: Walter Tapper
- Style: Early English
- Years built: 1902 to 1903

Administration
- Diocese: Worcester
- Archdeaconry: Worcester
- Deanery: Malvern
- Parish: Malvern Link with Cowleigh

The first completed work by the renowned architect Sir Walter Tapper, this is a Grade II listed church in the parish of Malvern Link and Cowleigh. The church was the gift of Louisa Vavasour Livingstone in memory of her husband Arthur Guinness Livingstone, the former Archdeacon of Sudbury. The foundation stone was laid on 19 December 1902, and dedicated by Bishop Charles Gore of Worcester on 3 October 1903.

As the church was paid for entirely by Mrs Livingstone, the parish used funds allocated to a planned Mission Hall for Newtown to instead build the hall adjacent to the Church.

The grounds have not been consecrated for burial.

== Exterior ==
The design is in the Early English style with lancet windows, and features a stone relief of the Ascension by Harry Hems on the tower. Twelve yew trees line a path to the main South door. There is no other external decoration. The nave roof is of Cumberland slate and the stonework is from Guiting quarry in the Cotswolds.

The tower contained two bells until the sixties, when they were sold to raise money for electrical work.

== Interior ==
The high altar is of stone, a feature of the influence of the Oxford Movement, with a triptych hanging above it, which is closed during Lent. The saints portrayed on the triptych are connected with the life and work of Arthur Livingston: St Patrick (Irish ancestry); St Frideswide (depicted with Christchurch, Oxford, where Livingstone was educated); Hugh of Lincoln; The Venerable Bede, as Livingston was Canon of Durham; St Ethelreda of Ely and St Edmund of East Anglia, due to Livingstone's connection with Sudbury. This is the work of Sister Catherine Ruth of the All Saints' Community, Margaret St., London.

The chancel screen, the font cover and the cross and candlesticks on the altar are the work of George Bainbridge Reynolds, while the rood is the work of an unknown artist from Oberammergau.

== Gallery ==
Church of the Ascension, Malvern Link
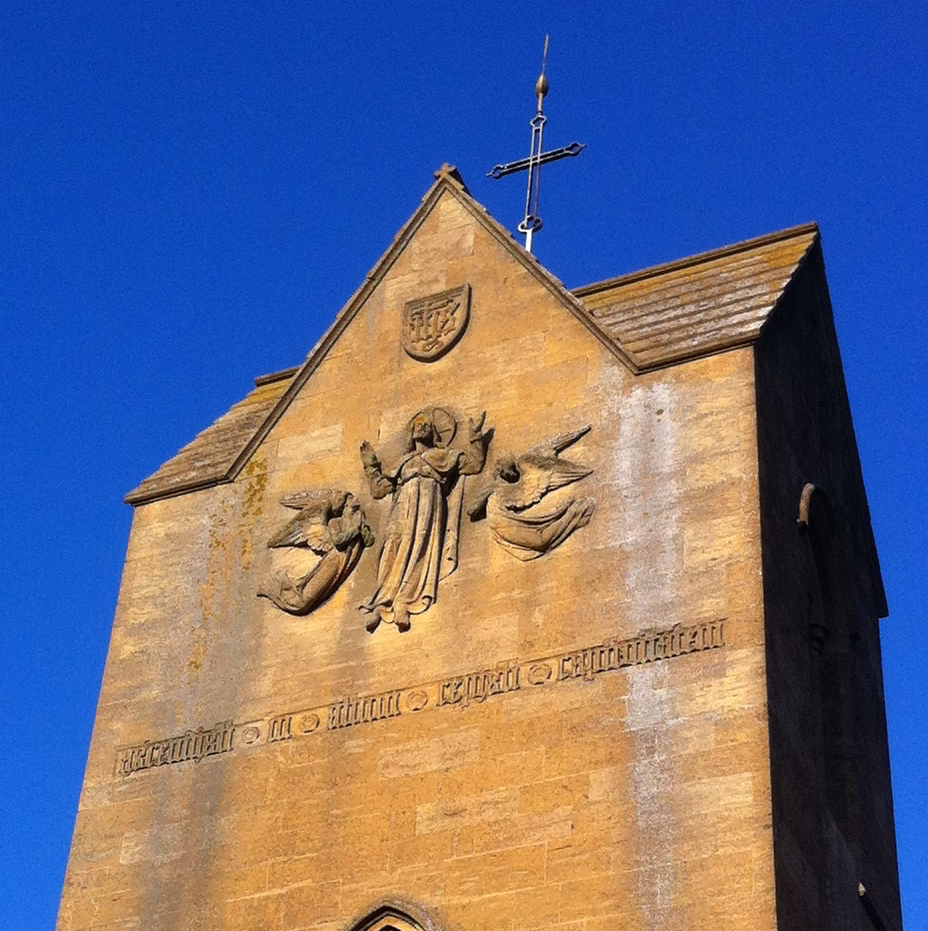
Relief sculpture of the Ascension by Farmer & Brindley, London.

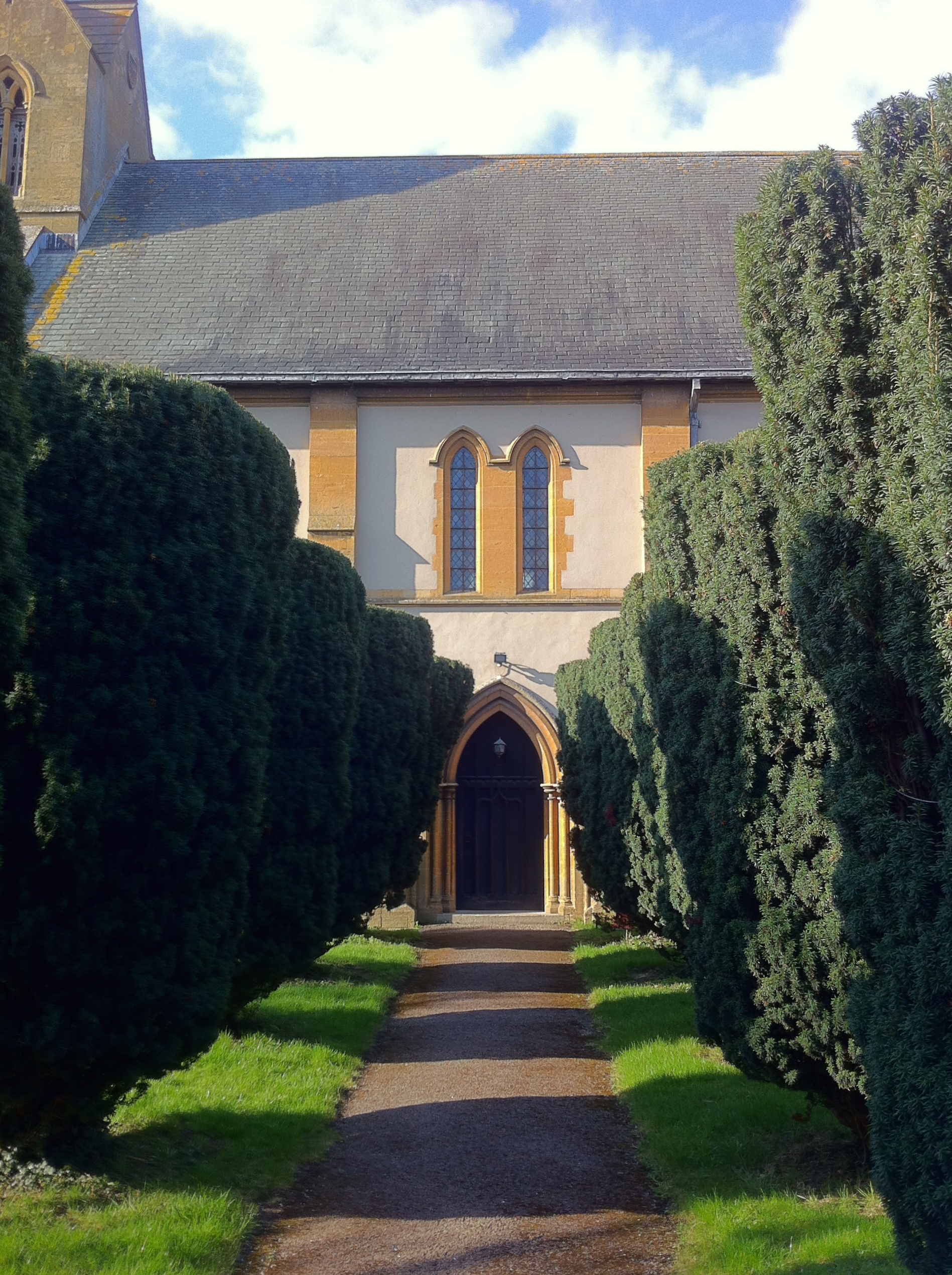
Main door and entrance path

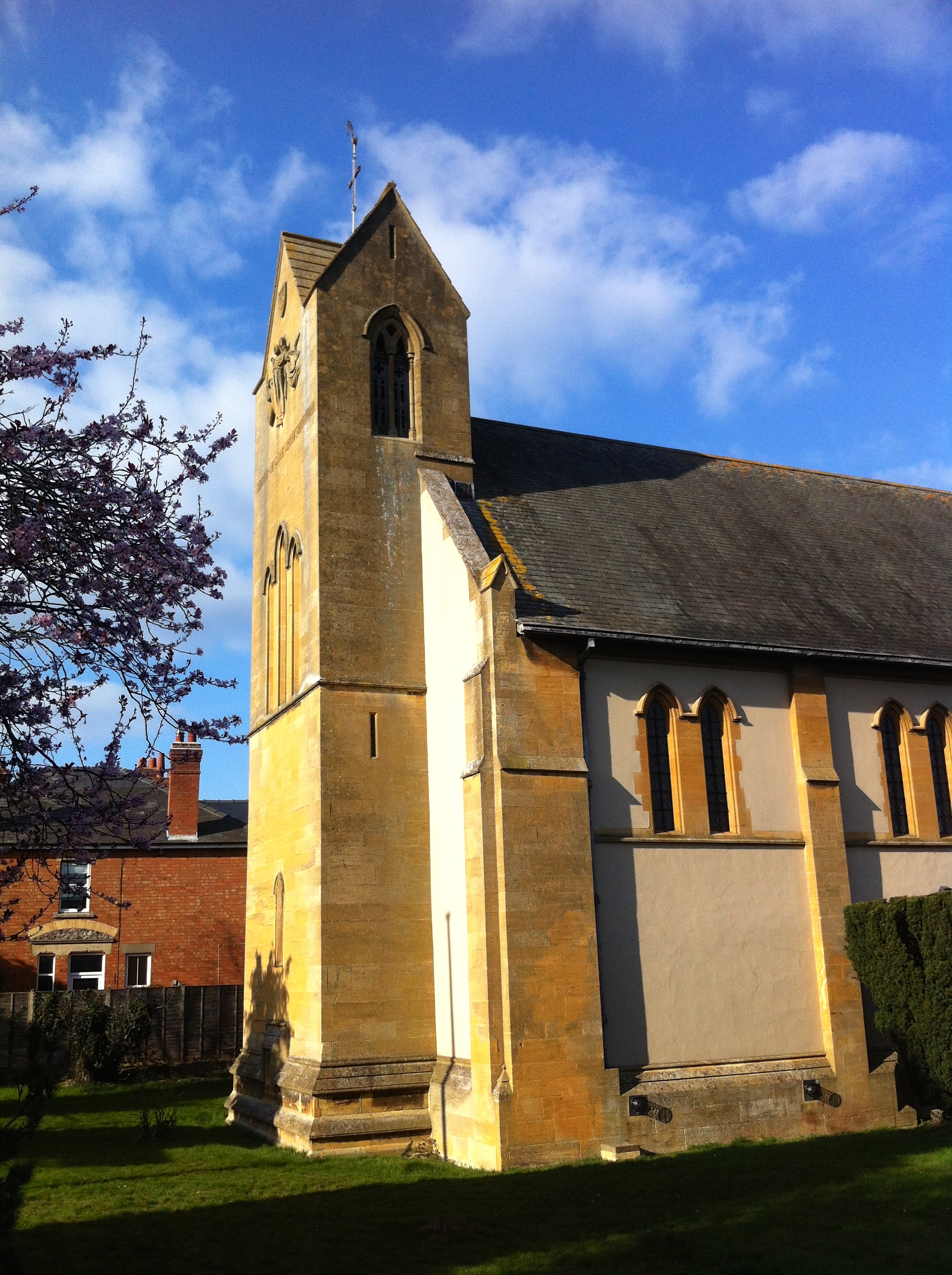
Exterior Eastern view

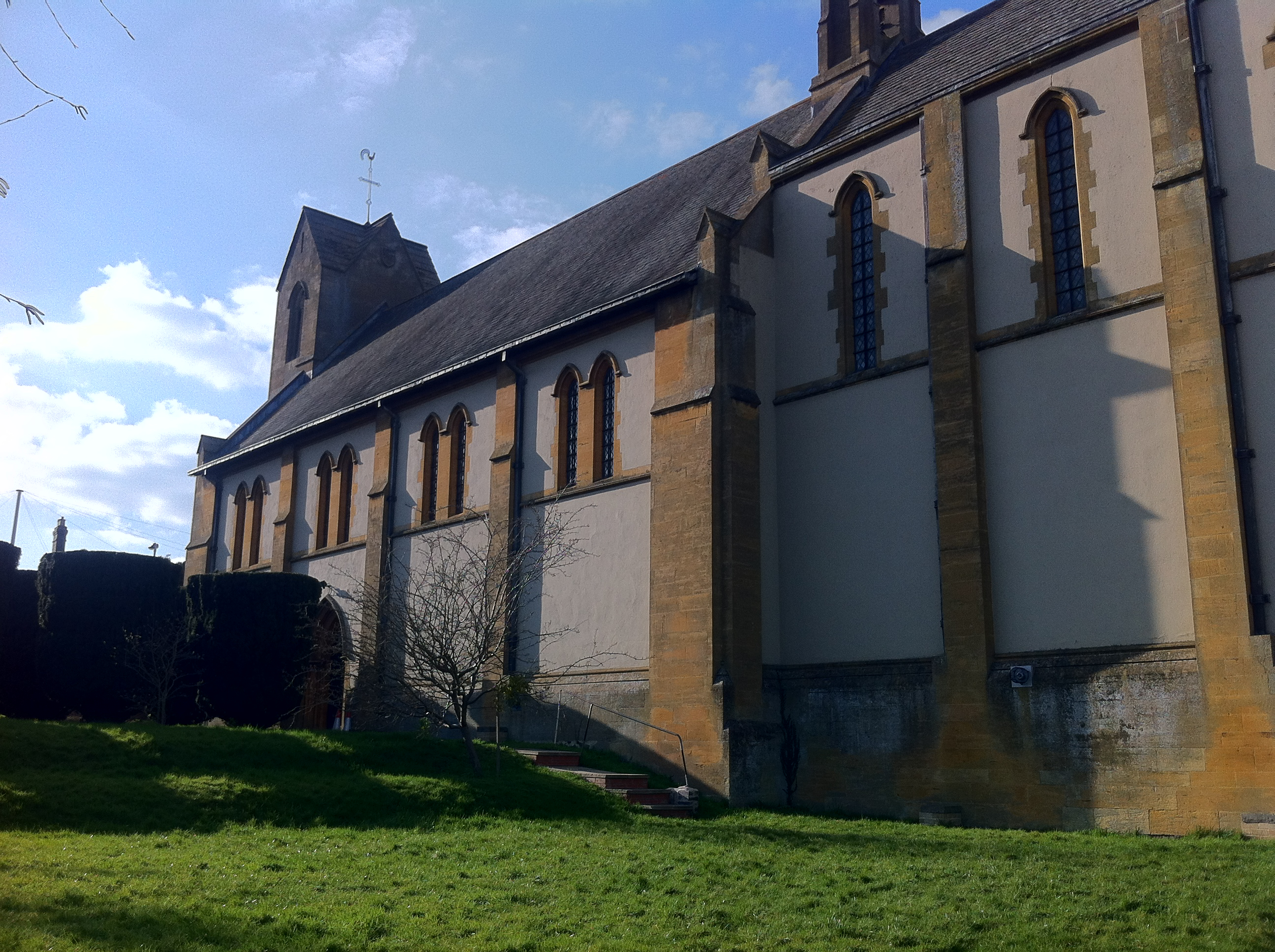
Exterior Western view

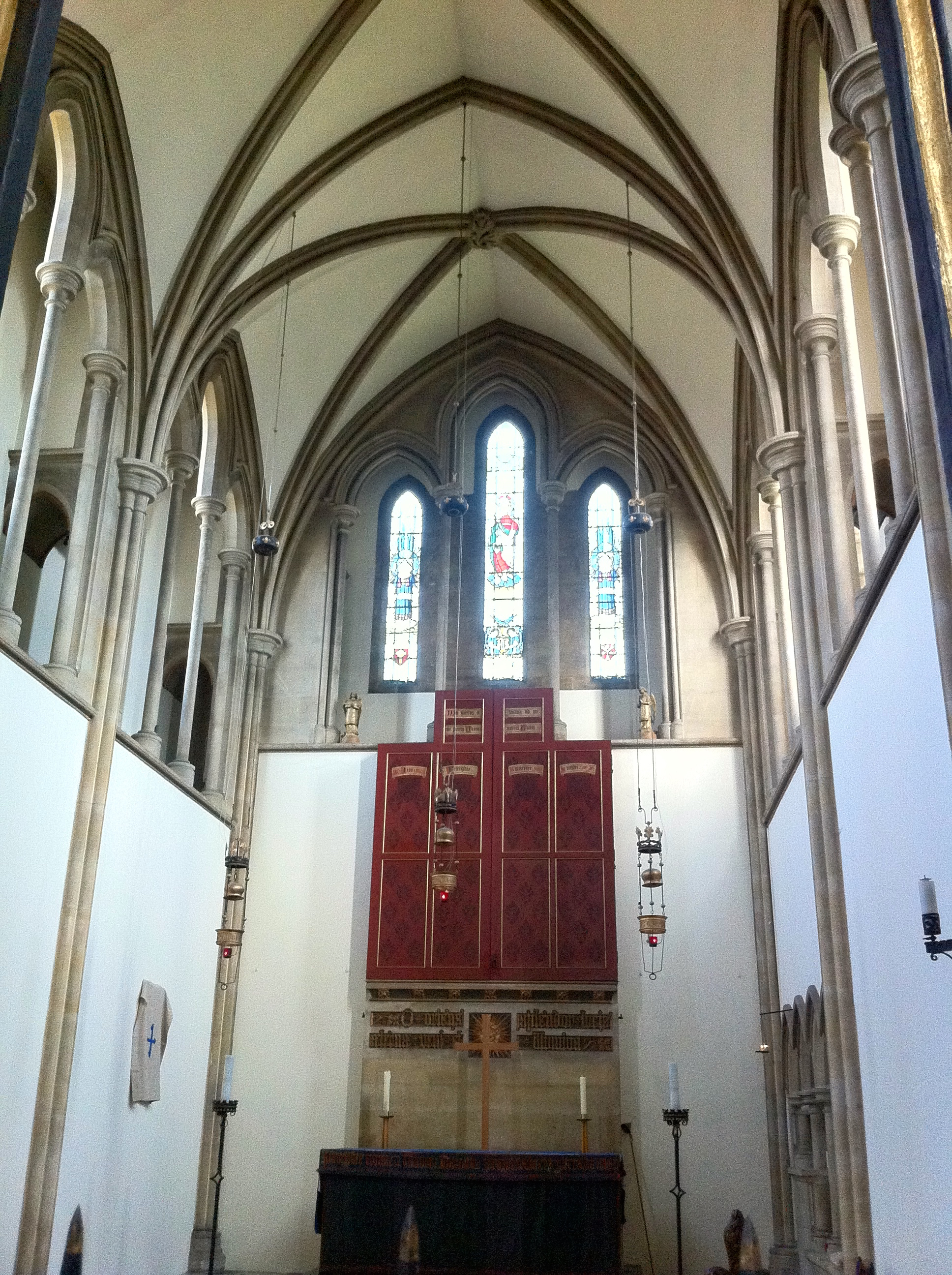
High Altar

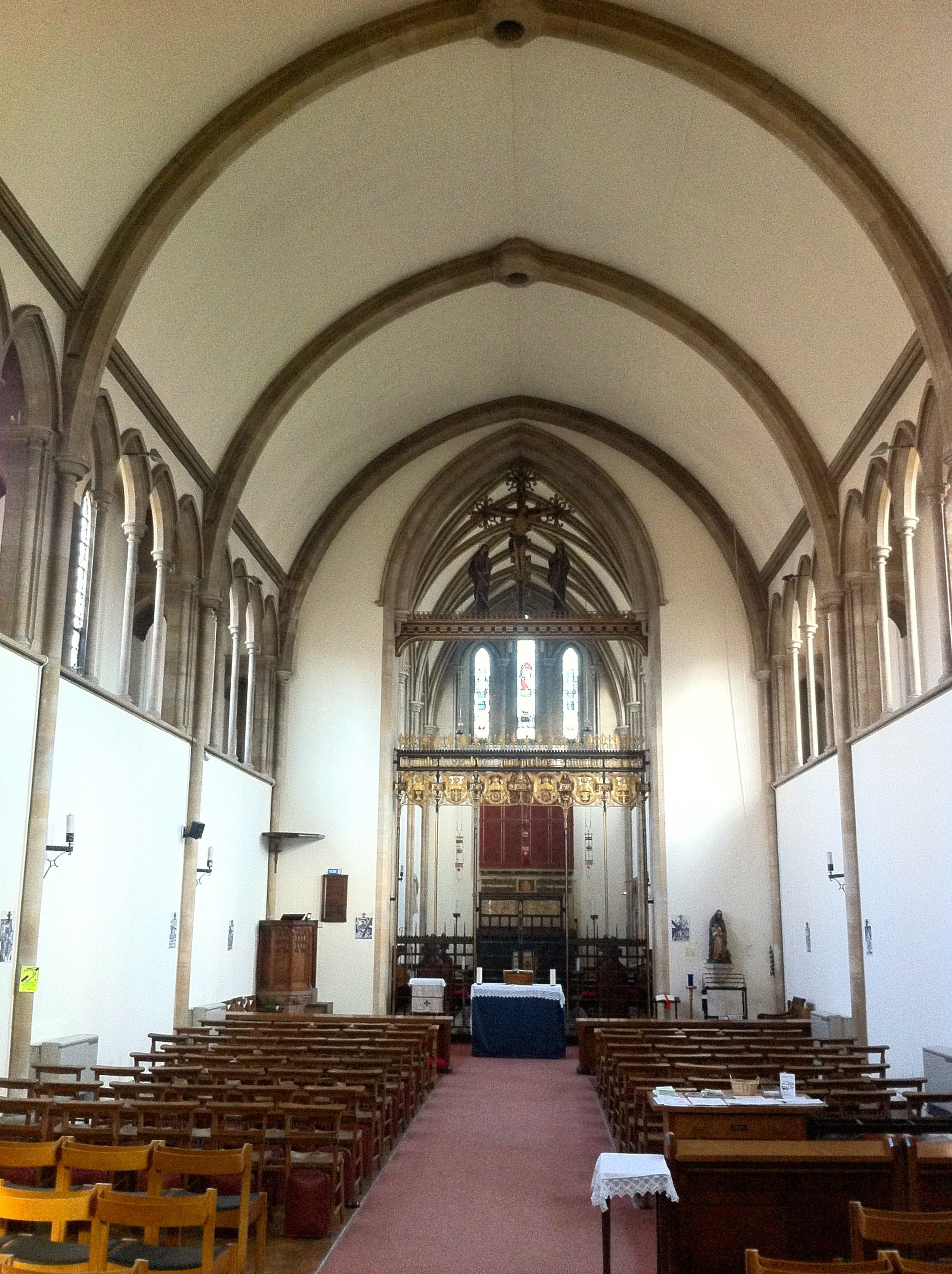
Interior Eastern view

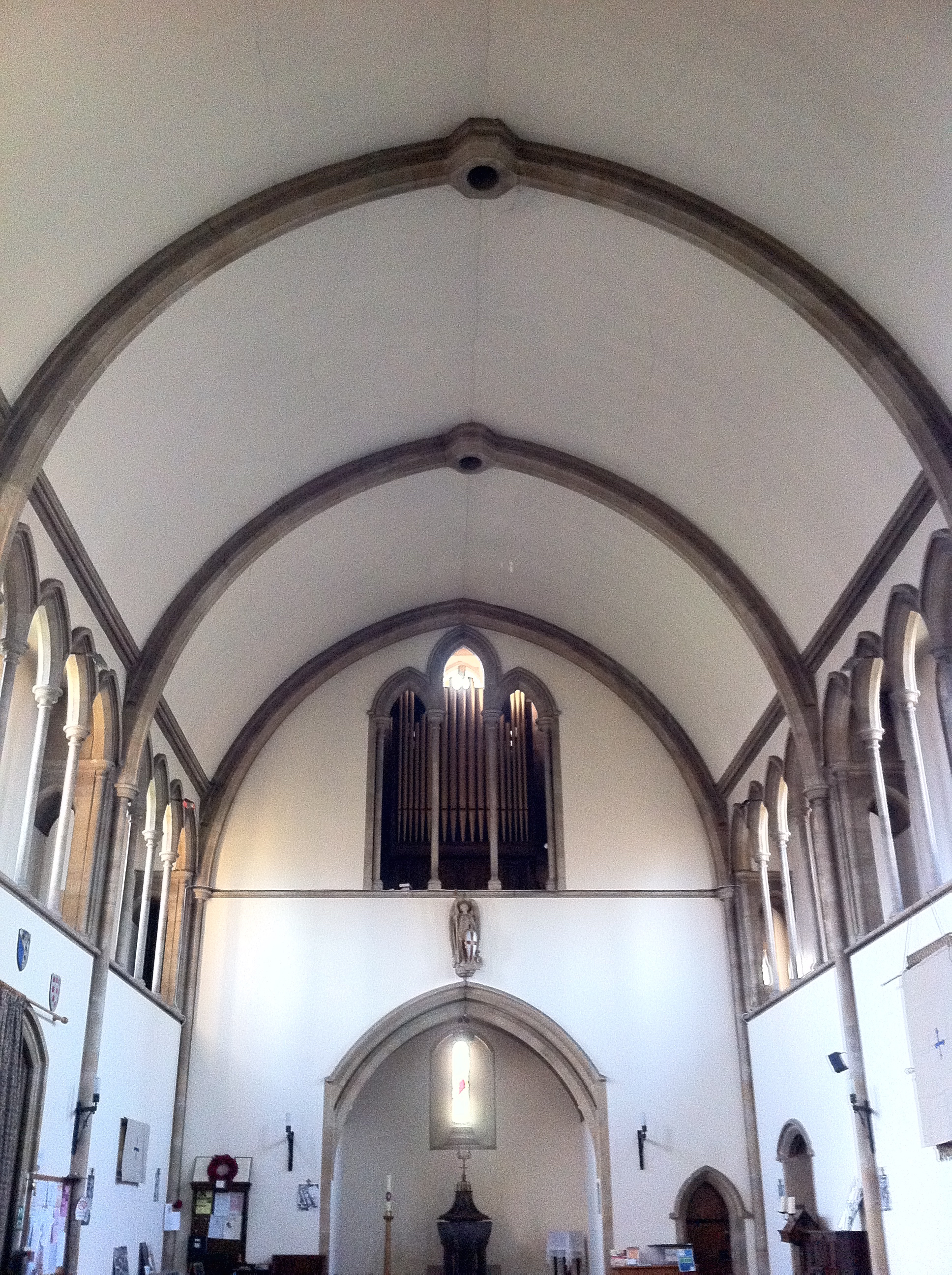
Interior Western view
