= Church of the Annunciation, Marble Arch =

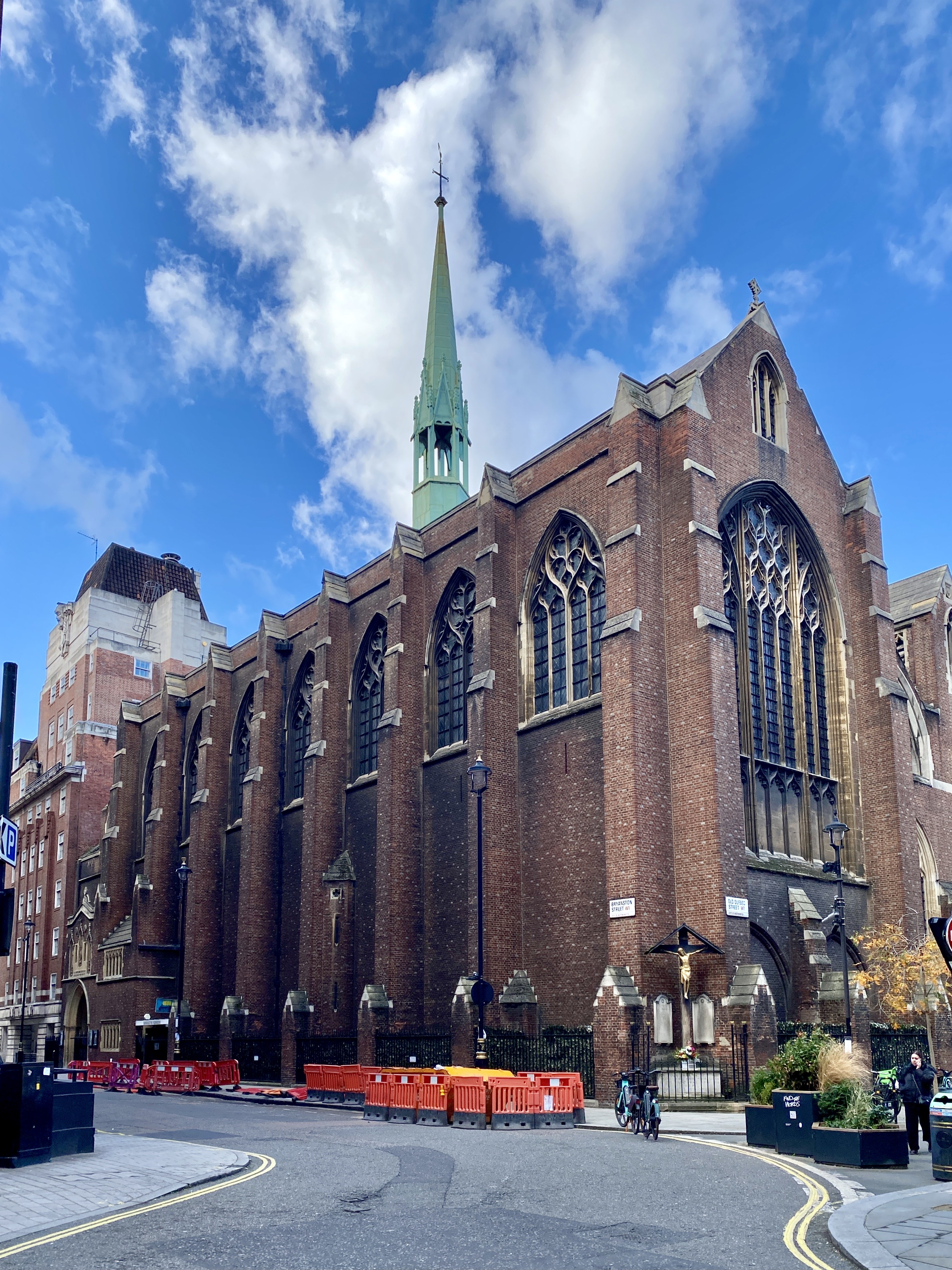
- Church of the Annunciation, Marble Arch

- Location of the Annunciation Church in London
- 51°30′52″N 0°9′31″W
- Location: Bryanston Street, Marble Arch, London, W1H 7AH
- Country: England
- Denomination: Church of England
- Churchmanship: Anglo-Catholic
- Website: www.annunciationmarblearch.org.uk

Architecture
- Heritage designation: Grade II* listed
- Architect: Sir Walter Tapper
- Style: Gothic Revival
- Years built: 1911

Administration
- Diocese: London
- Archdeaconry: Charing Cross
- Deanery: Westminster Marylebone
- Parish: St Marylebone Annunciation Bryanston Street

Clergy
- Vicar: The Reverend Dr Lincoln Harvey

The Church of the Annunciation, Marble Arch, is a Church of England parish church in the Marble Arch district of London, England. It is dedicated to the Annunciation to the Blessed Virgin Mary. It is a Gothic revival building designed by Sir Walter Tapper and built in 1912–1913. It is a Grade II* listed building.

Worship at the Annunciation is Anglo-Catholic and is supported by a tradition of choral singing. The church is closely linked to a local primary school, Hampden Gurney School.

== History ==
The Church is near Bryanston Square and Montagu Square in the neoclassical Portman Estate area of London, which was developed by Henry William Portman in the 18th century.

A chapel of ease called the Quebec Chapel was founded on the present site in 1787 to commemorate the Battle of Quebec. It is thought that this chapel was built on the site of the riding school of the Portman Barracks. By the early 20th century the chapel had fallen into disrepair and it was demolished in 1911.

Among the priests-in-charge of the Quebec Chapel was the theologian and hymnodist, Henry Alford, who wrote the hymn "Come, ye thankful people, come".

The Annunciation Church has always been closely associated with the Anglo-Catholic movement started in the mid 19th century, and in the early part of the 20th century many of its adherents were strongly opposed to the growing Ecumenical movement. In May 1951 an interdenominational Christian rally was held in nearby Hyde Park to coincide with the launch of the Festival of Britain. A number of Anglo-Catholic clergy and lay people, led by Rev. Hugh Ross Williamson, held a protest meeting at the Annunciation Church to express their opposition to Bishops of the Church of England sharing a platform with Methodists, Baptists and other Non-Conformist churches, organisations which, in their opinion, did "not accept the traditional Faith of the Church". In a signed letter, they expressed the concern that "the participation of the Church of England may give the additional impression that Roman Catholics are the only religious body which defend the full Catholic Faith." The poet John Betjeman was among the signatories; although he admitted to T. S. Eliot (a fellow Anglo-Catholic and a churchwarden of St Stephen's, Gloucester Road) that he found the tone of the protest "somewhat extreme", he nevertheless declared "I have nailed my colours to the mast and cannot let down my co-signatories." Rose Macaulay, a novelist, also commented on the protest at the Annunciation, expressing dismay at opposition to the rally.

== Architecture ==
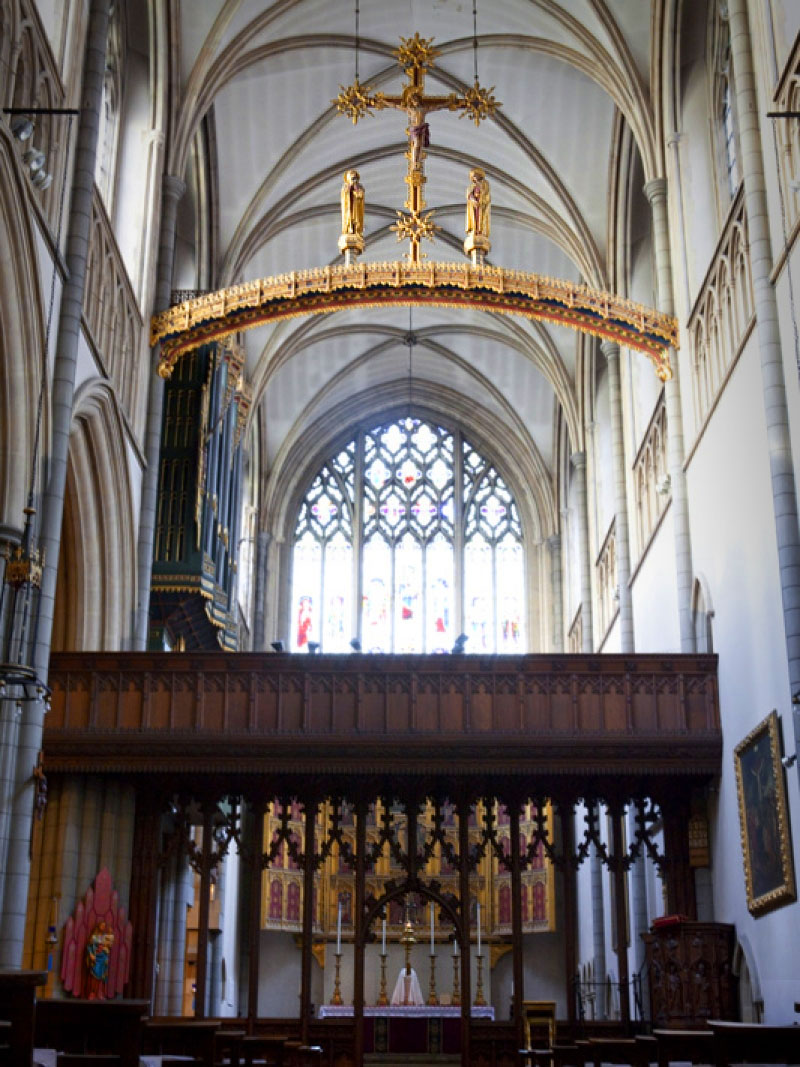
Robert Bridgeman's triumphal cross dominates the nave

The present church was designed by the English architect Sir Walter Tapper and built in 1912–1913. Tapper was a pupil of George Frederick Bodley, a leading designer of Mediæval revival architecture. It is a tall red brick church designed in the Late Gothic Revival (or Edwardian Gothic) style. It features stone dressings and buttresses and a gabled bell tower. The single bell was cast in 1913 by John Warner & Sons of Spitalfields.

Nikolaus Pevsner referred to the church in his Buildings of England as "a fragment of a major medieval church".

The interior has a rood screen with a high triumphal crucifix over an arch that is thought to have been crafted by Robert Bridgeman of Lichfield to designs by Tapper. The high altar reredos was designed by Tapper and made by Jack Bewsey who also designed most of the stained glass.

Around the nave are plaster cast Stations of the Cross designed by Aloïs de Beule of Ghent. The lapidarium spanning the arch between the sanctuary and the Lady Chapel was designed by Augustus Welby Northmore Pugin and originally hung above the high altar of St Chad's Cathedral, Birmingham.

The organ was built in 1915 by Sir Frederick Rothwell with a case also designed by Tapper. The organ underwent restoration by Bishop & Son organ builders in 1989.

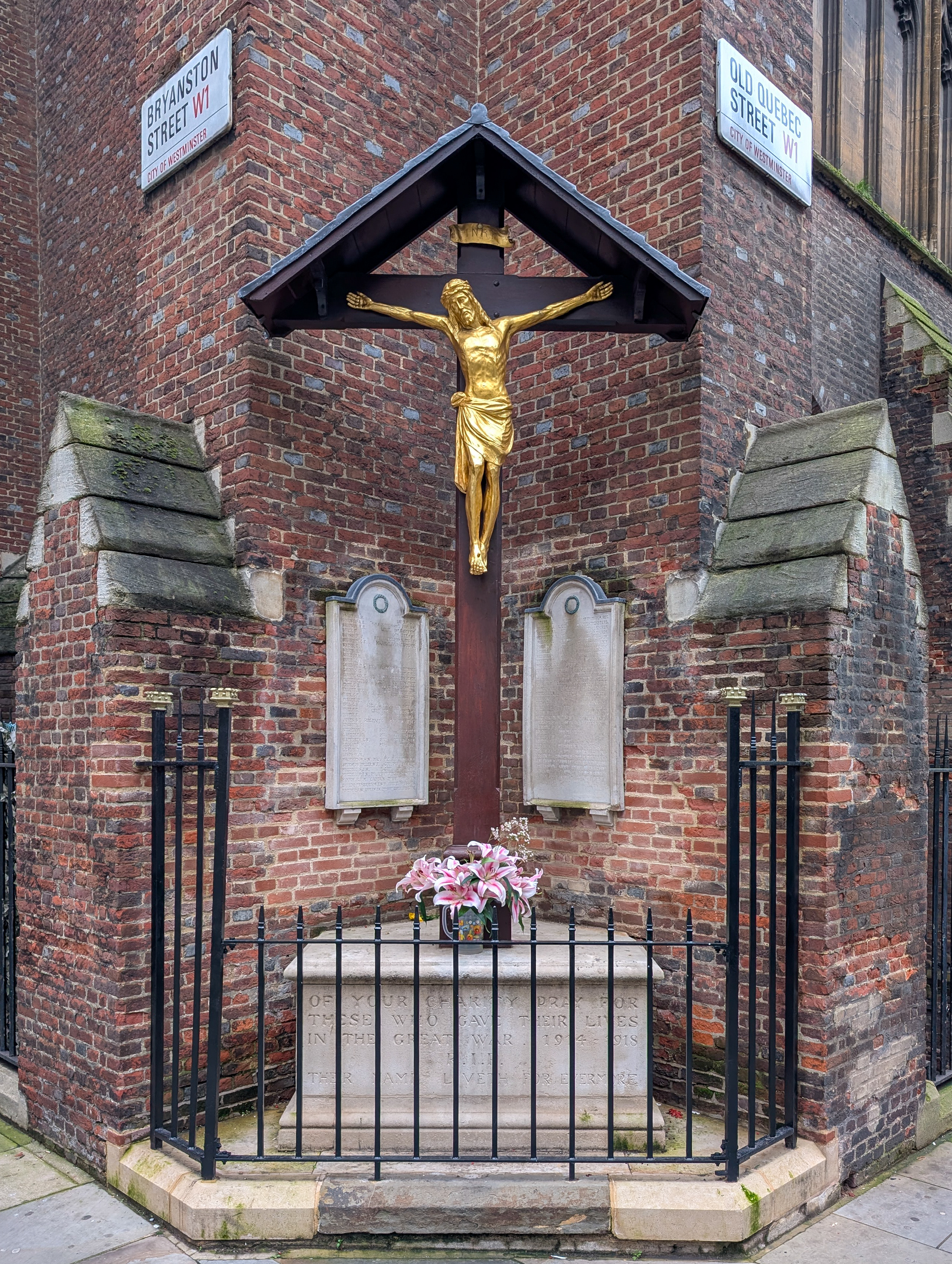
Parish war memorial on the corner of Bryanston and Old Quebec streets
