= Margaret Marjory Fraser =

Canadian military nurse (1885–1918)

Pearl Fraser
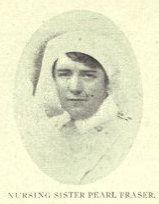
- Born: Margaret Marjory Fraser; 20 March 1885; New Glasgow, Nova Scotia, Canada
- Died: 27 June 1918 (aged 33)
- Occupation: Matron
- Military Service
- Allegiance: Canada
- Branch: Canadian Expeditionary Force
- Service years: 1914–1918
- Rank: Captain

Margaret Marjory "Pearl" Fraser (20 March 1885 – 27 June 1918) was a Canadian military nurse from Nova Scotia who served in the First World War. She died aboard HMHS Llandovery Castle when it was torpedoed and sunk.

== Biography ==
Pearl Fraser was born on 20 March 1885 in New Glasgow, Nova Scotia to parents Duncan Cameron Fraser and Bessie Grant Fraser (née Graham). Her father was the lieutenant governor of Nova Scotia from 1906 until 1910. She had six siblings, among them Alistair Fraser, who served as lieutenant governor from 1952 until 1958.

Fraser attended the Lord Stanley Institute in Ottawa for nursing training, and enlisted in the Canadian Expeditionary Force in Quebec on 28 September 1914. She served on hospital ships in European waters as an acting matron for four years, until she died aboard HMHS Llandovery Castle when it was torpedoed and sunk on 27 June 1918. She was 33 years old and single when she died.

Across her military career, Fraser was the recipient of the 1914–15 Star, the British War Medal, and the Victory Medal. She is commemorated at the Halifax Memorial in Point Pleasant Park, and on the piper monument in New Glasgow.

== Legacy ==
In 2019, Fraser was among the Canadian nurses who died in World War I to be commemorated in an opera by the composer Stephanie Martin and the playwright Paul Ciufo. The New Glasgow writer Lynn MacLean included Fraser in her historical fiction book Bravest Hearts.
