= Walter Tapper =

English architect (1861–1935)

Sir Walter Tapper
- Walter Tapper
- Born: 21 April 1861; Bovey Tracey, Devon, England
- Died: 21 September 1935 (aged 74); Dean's Yard, Westminster, England
- Occupation: Architect
- Awards: ARIBA (1889); FRIBA (1912); President of the Royal Institute of British Architects, 1927–29; ARA (1926) FSA; KCVO (1935)
- Practice: Bodley and Garner; Tapper
- Buildings: Church of the Resurrection, Mirfield (1908); Church of the Annunciation, Marble Arch (1912–13)
- Projects: Liverpool Cathedral design competition (1901–03)

Sir Walter John Tapper KCVO FRIBA RA FSA (21 April 1861 – 21 September 1935) was an English architect known for his work in the Gothic Revival style and a number of church buildings. He worked with some leading ecclesiastical architects of his day and was President of the Royal Institute of British Architects. Tapper was appointed Surveyor of the Fabric of Westminster Abbey and acted as consulting architect to York Minster and Manchester Cathedral. On his death in 1935 his son Michael Tapper completed some of his works.

== Life and career ==
Walter Tapper was born in Bovey Tracey, Devon, in 1861, the son of George Tapper, a stonemason, later a builder. Little is known of his early life, but from the age of thirteen he served his articles at Rowell & Sons, an architects' practice in nearby Newton Abbot. He then moved to London and after a brief period working for Basil Champneys, joined Bodley & Garner, the firm of prominent Gothic Revival architects G. F. Bodley and Thomas Garner, working alongside another budding Gothic Revival architect, Ninian Comper. While working there Tapper began a romantic relationship with Catherine Lydia Jotcham, a showroom assistant at Watts & Co, a church furnishing company which had been founded by Bodley and Garner along with fellow Gothic revivalist George Gilbert Scott. In 1886, he married Catherine Jotcham; a few months later their first child was born. The couple had two children: a son, Michael John, in 1886 (who grew up to become an architect himself), and a daughter, Kathleen, who was born in 1889.

Faced with the responsibility of fatherhood in his mid-twenties, Tapper put off the financial risk of going into business on his own and remained with Bodley & Garner for eighteen years, rising to the role of manager. Throughout this time, he maintained a close business relationship with Watts & Co, procuring furnishings for church projects.

In 1900 Tapper started his own practice, beginning his independent work in Gray's Inn but later moving to St John's Wood, where he worked from his own home at 10 Melina Place.

In 1927–28 Tapper served as president of the Royal Institute of British Architects. His presidential address of 1927 was critical of modern consumerism and mass production, and Tapper cited the absence of a "national virtue of dignity" as detrimental to architectural greatness.

In 1928 Tapper was appointed Surveyor of the Fabric of Westminster Abbey. His work there included much restoration work and designing additions to the building, including a new gallery above the roof of the east cloister to connect the Abbey Library with the Muniment Room. Tapper was greatly occupied with the conservation of deteriorating stonework which had been damaged by pollution; the Henry VII Lady Chapel became a particular problem in 1932 when falling masonry forced its closure on grounds of safety. Tapper repaired and restored the chapel, and as part of the project designed a new altar for the chapel, based on the original altar which had been designed in 1517 by the Italian sculptor Pietro Torrigiano but was destroyed during the Restoration. Tapper's reconstruction included parts of Torrigiano's original which had been preserved in the Ashmolean Museum in Oxford and the original baldachino, framing a painting of the Madonna and Child by Bartolommeo Vivarini (c.1480).

Catherine died suddenly in 1932, and the grieving Walter, unable to remain in the family home without her, was given accommodation in Dean's Yard, next to Westminster Abbey. Tapper remained in his post at Westminster Abbey until his death in 1935. One month before he died, he was made a Knight Commander of the Royal Victorian Order by King George V. Tapper's grave is in the west cloister of the Abbey and bears the inscription

WALTER JOHN TAPPER K.C.V.O., R.A. 1861–1935 SURVEYOR TO THE FABRIC 1928–1935

As well as the stylistic influences of his contemporaries in architectural practice, Tapper was also affected by the writings of John Ruskin and the Aesthetic movement. He often spoke about love to explain his artistic philosophy, and associated beauty (especially that of medieval architecture) with love and goodness. Tapper was deeply religious, and aimed to express divine and human love through his architecture.

== Buildings ==
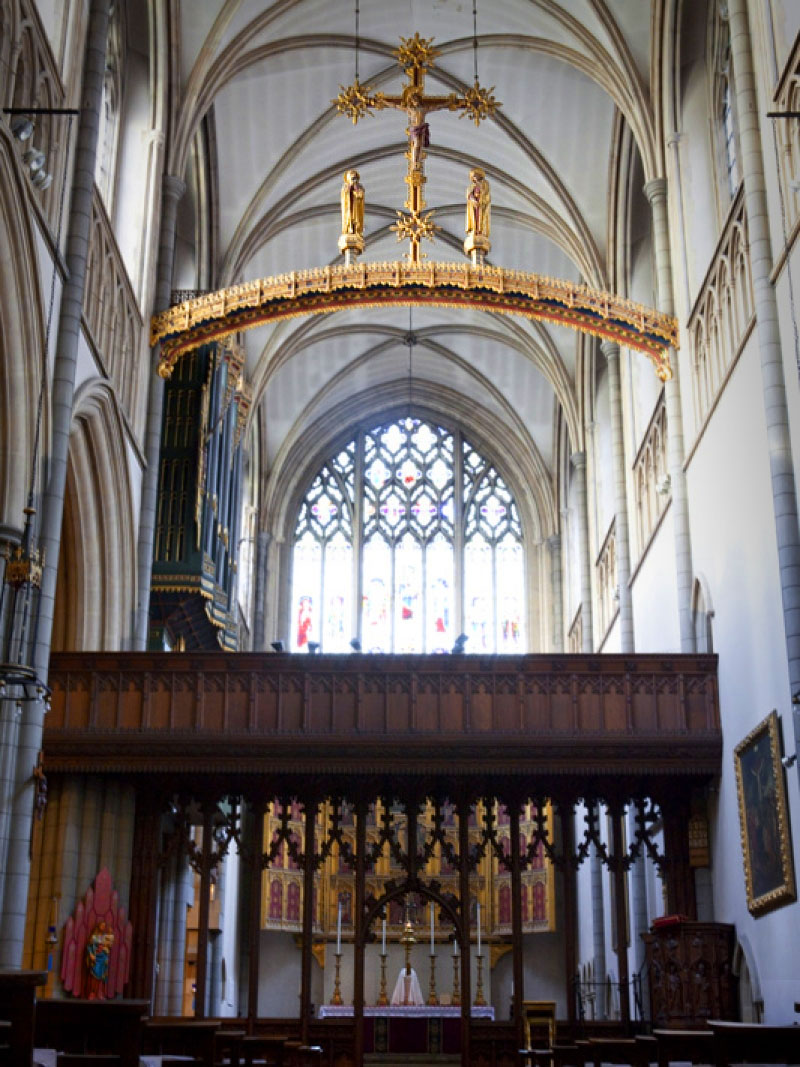
Interior of Tapper's Church of the Annunciation at Marble Arch (1912–13)

Tapper's first independent church project was the Church of the Ascension at Malvern Link in Worcestershire (1903). This Grade-II listed structure was designed in the Early English style with lancet windows and features a stone relief of the Ascension by Harry Hems.

In 1901 Tapper submitted an entry into the design competition for Liverpool Cathedral which was assessed by G. F. Bodley and Norman Shaw; Tapper was shortlisted for the final along with four other submissions from Austin & Paley, Sir Charles Nicholson, Malcolm Stark and Giles Gilbert Scott. Scott's design was selected in 1903, but Tapper's scheme was highly regarded; Sir Charles Herbert Reilly, whose entry for the design competition was also unsuccessful, wrote of Tapper's rejected design, "it seemed to me one of the finest architectural conceptions I had ever seen. I had no idea... that Gothic architecture could be used with such breadth and spaciousness combined with such delicacy and romance."

In 1905 Tapper was commissioned to build a large Romanesque-style church to serve the growing population of Southend-on-Sea in Essex. His church, dedicated to St Erkenwald, was built of yellow stock brick and featured a large rose window and flying buttresses. Its grand design and exceptionally large dimensions were intentionally aspirational, as the church was said to have been built with the intention of eventual elevation to cathedral status. In the end, St Erkenwald's proved to be surplus to requirements; with dwindling church attendance the church was eventually closed in 1978 and became derelict. Following a fire, the church was demolished in 1995 to make way for residential property development.

One of his notable architectural achievements is the Church of the Resurrection, at the Mother House of the eponymous Community of the Resurrection, at Mirfield, West Yorkshire. Only the eastern portion of the church was built to Tapper's highly ambitious design which, had it been completed, would have produced a monastic church of a scale hardly seen in England since the Reformation. Begun in 1908, building was stopped because of shortage of funds and by design problems. It was eventually completed by Michael Tapper as a memorial to Charles Gore, theologian, bishop (of Worcester, then Birmingham, then Oxford) and founder of the Community, and whose mortal remains lie in a fine tomb within its walls.

Tapper's Church of the Annunciation, Marble Arch in London (1912–13) is one of his more notable works; the tall red brick structure occupies a limited space in a densely built-up corner of New Quebec Street and Bryanston Street and features an array of flying buttresses. The Mediæval-revival interior is noted for its completely vaulted structure and visual height; the windows are placed high to eliminate street noise, the organ is placed in a gallery above the sanctuary and the nave is dominated by a striking triumphal crucifix atop an arch (Robert Bridgeman of Lichfield). Tapper designed the internal fittings including the organ casing and the high altar reredos, executed by Jack Bewsey who also designed most of the stained glass. As part of his diploma work for the Royal Academy, Tapper submitted a watercolour of the Annunciation church exterior painted by the architectural artist Charles Gascoyne, indicating that Tapper considered this building to be one of his most successful projects.

In addition to church building, Tapper was also engaged in ecclesiastical decorative fittings and ornaments. The ornate entrance to the choir at Ludlow Parish Church is his work, as is the gilded altarpiece in St Chad's, Stafford and the organ casing and font cover in St Wulfram's Church, Grantham. He designed a silver processional cross for York Minster as well as the ten oak screens bearing the names of the 1,513 women who died in the line of service during WWI, as part of the Five Sisters window memorial. He also enjoyed a lucrative arrangement with the Gas Light and Coke Company, designing appliance showrooms in the Art Deco Streamline Moderne style.

Notable buildings & projects
Photo	Building	Location	Date	Notes
	Church of the Ascension, Malvern Link	Malvern, Worcestershire 52.127788°N 2.331237°W	1903	
	St Erkenwald's, Southend-on-Sea	Southend-on-Sea 51.536776°N 0.723936°E	1905–10	Demolished 1995
	Church of the Resurrection, Mirfield	Mirfield, West Yorkshire 53.682707°N 1.713808°W	1908	
	Turville Grange	Turville Heath, Buckinghamshire	1904	Added a "parallel rear wing" to this 18th century country house; listed Grade II in 1955
	St Oswald's, Lythe	Lythe, North Yorkshire 54.506645°N 0.688531°W	1910–11	Rebuild of C13 church
	Derby Lodge	Shipley Estate, Derbyshire	1911	
	St Stephen's, Grimsby	Grimsby	1911–14	demolished 1973/4
	Church of the Annunciation, Marble Arch	Marble Arch, London 51.51444°N 0.15861°W	1912–13	
	Guildford Grammar School Chapel	Guildford, Western Australia	1912–14	
	St Michael's, Little Coates	Little Coates	1915	
	St Mary's Church, Harrogate	Harrogate, North Yorkshire 53.987944°N 1.551658°W	1916	Now known as the Kairos Church; closed 2007 owing to structural problems
	St Mark's, Whiteley Village	Whiteley Village, Surrey	1919	
	Loughborough Carillon	Loughborough, Leicestershire	1919–23	
	Memorial Cross	Lancaster Gate, London	1921	
	Nymans	Haywards Heath, West Sussex	1920s	Stone Tudor-style mansion house; ruined by fire in 1947
	Our Lady of Mercy and St Thomas of Canterbury	Gorton, Manchester	1927	Now the Mount Olivet Apostolic Church
	St Oswald's, Preston	Deepdale, Preston 53.771882°N 2.68015°W	1934	Original building demolished c.1987
	Newgate, Chester	Chester city walls 53.18902°N 2.88819°W	1938	Completed after Tapper's death by his son, Michael
