= List of Canadian nurses who died in World War I =

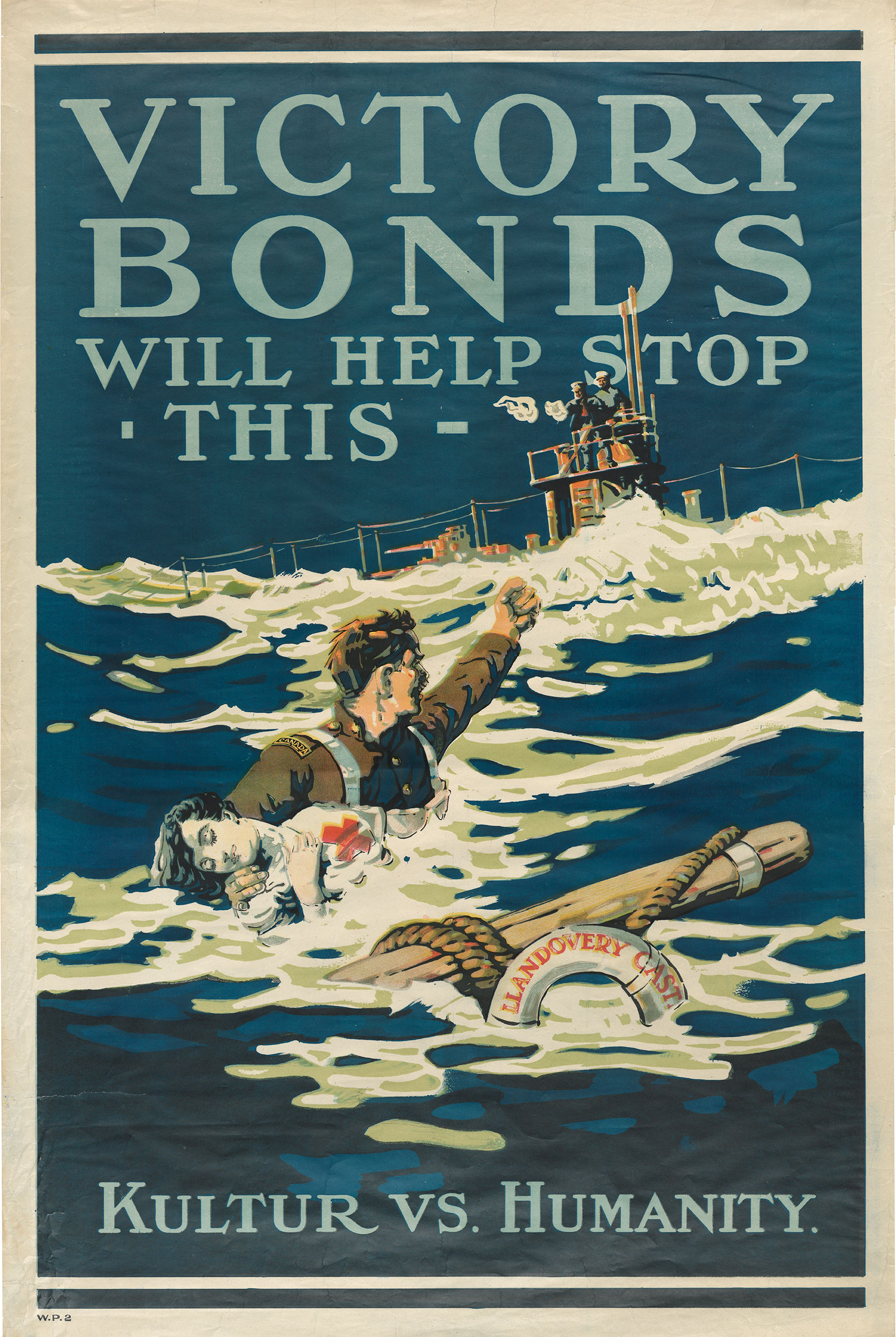
Propaganda poster showing a dead Canadian nurse after the sinking of Hospital Ship HMHS Llandovery Castle

This is a list of Canadian nurses who died during World War I. Canadian nurses were given the nickname "Bluebirds," because of their blue dresses and white veils. Out of the over three thousand Canadian nurses who volunteered their services 53 nurses died while serving their country. The military history of Canadian nurses during World War I began on August 4, 1914, when the United Kingdom entered the First World War (1914–1918) by declaring war on Germany. The British declaration of war automatically brought Canada into the war, because of Canada's legal status as a British Dominion which left foreign policy decisions in the hands of the British parliament.

When Canada entered the war there were five Permanent Force nurses and 57 listed in reserve. By 1917 the Canadian Army Nursing Service included 2,030 nurses, of which 1,886 were overseas, with 203 on reserve. By the end of the war, 3,141 had enlisted. The First World War had a Casualty Clearing Station, an advance unit, that was close to the front line. Being near the front these stations were often bombed or hit by artillery. In one such incident in May 1918 a number of nurses were killed when the building they were tending wounded was bombed by Imperial German Aircraft. In another incident, on June 27, 1918, 14 nurses were killed when their hospital ship Hospital Ship HMHS Llandovery Castle was torpedoed while travelling from Halifax, Nova Scotia, to Liverpool, England.

War wasn't the only threat to nurses as at least six died in late 1918 of "pneumonia," probably related to the Spanish flu which raged throughout the world during the winter of 1918/1919.

== List of Canadian nurses who died during WWI ==
No.	Name	Unit	Division	Age	Date of death	Photo	Circumstances of death	Place of death	Ref(s)
1	Agnes Estelle Alpaugh	Canadian Army Medical Corps		27	October 12, 1918				
2	Dorothy Mary Yarwood Baldwin	Canadian Army Nursing Service	3 Stationary Hospital	26	May 30, 1918		Killed during a bombing raid	Raid at Doulens, France	
3	Margaret Elisa Baker	Canadian Army Medical Corps		45	May 30, 1919			Ontario, Canada	
4	Miriam Eastman Baker	Canadian Army Medical Corps	15 General Hospital	32	October 17, 1918			UK	
5	Christina Campbell	Canadian Army Medical Corps	5 General Hospital	40	June 27, 1918		Drowning	Hospital Ship HMHS Llandovery Castle	
6	Bertha Bartlett	Newfoundland Voluntary Aid Detachment		23	November 3, 1918			London, United Kingdom	
7	Ernestine Champagne	Canadian Army Medical Corps	8 General Hospital	39	March 24, 1919			Quebec, Canada	
8	Ainslie St Clair Dagg	Canadian Army Medical Corps	15 General Hospital	26	November 29, 1918		Died of pneumonia	Buckinghamshire, United Kingdom	
9	Lena Aloa Davis	Canadian Army Nursing Service	4 General Hospital	29	February 21, 1918		Died of illness contracted on duty in Salonika	Greece	
10	Gertrude Donaldson (Petty)	Canadian Army Medical Corps	1 General Hospital	26	July 29, 1919			Ontario, Canada	
11	Carola Josephine Douglas	Canadian Army Medical Corps			June 27, 1918		Drowning	Hospital Ship HMHS Llandovery Castle	
12	Alexina Dussault	Canadian Army Medical Corps			June 27, 1918		Drowning	Hospital Ship HMHS Llandovery Castle	
13	Agnes Florien Forneri	Canadian Army Medical Corps	8 General Hospital	28	April 24, 1918			12 Canadian Hospital, Bramshott, UK	
14	Minnie Aenath Follette	Canadian Army Medical Corps			June 27, 1918		Drowning	Hospital Ship HMHS Llandovery Castle	
15	Margaret Jane Fortescue	Canadian Army Medical Corps			June 27, 1918		Drowning	Hospital Ship HMHS Llandovery Castle	
16	Margaret Marjory (Pearl) Fraser	Canadian Army Medical Corps			June 27, 1918		Drowning	Hospital Ship HMHS Llandovery Castle	
17	Christine Frederickson	Canadian Army Medical Corps		32	October 28, 1918			Manitoba, Canada	
18	Minnie Katherine Gallaher	Canadian Army Medical Corps			June 27, 1918		Drowning	Hospital Ship HMHS Llandovery Castle	
19	Sarah Ellen Garbutt	Canadian Army Nursing Service	Ontario Military Hospital	49	August 20, 1917		Died of cancer	Vincent Square Hospital London	
20	Grace Mabel Grant	Canadian Army Medical Corps		35	September 12, 1919		Died of Nephritis ( inflammation of the kidneys)	Halifax	
21	Matilda Ethel Greene	Canadian Army Nursing Service	7 General Hospital	32	October 9 1918		Died of pneumonia	No 24 British General Hospital, Etaples, France	
22	Victoria Belle Hennan	Canadian Army Medical Corps	9 General Hospital	31	October 23, 1918			Kent, United Kingdom	
23	Myrtle Margaret Hunt	Canadian Army Medical Corps		28	January 16, 1918			Nova Scotia, Canada	
24	Jessie Brown Jaggard	Canadian Army Medical Corps	3 Stationary Hospital	42	September 25, 1915		Died through illness	West Mudros, Lemnos	
25	Lenna Mae Jenner	Canadian Army Medical Corps		29	December 12, 1918			Kent, United Kingdom	
26	Jessie Jarvis	Canadian Army Medical Corps		29	May 23, 1918			Nova Scotia, Canada	
27	Ida Lilian Kealy	Canadian Army Medical Corps	1 General Hospital	38	March 12, 1918		Died of pneumonia	Hampshire, United Kingdom	
28	Jessie Nelson King	Canadian Army Medical Corps	1 General Hospital	26	April 4, 1919			Pas de Calais, France	
29	Margaret Lowe	Canadian Army Nursing Service	1 General Hospital	30	May 28, 1918		Killed during a bombing raid	Etaples, France	
30	Katherine Maud MacDonald	Canadian Army Nursing Service	1 General Hospital	25	May 19, 1918		Killed during a bombing raid	Etaples, France	
31	Agnes McDougall	Canadian Army Medical Corps		46	July 18, 1919			Ontario, Canada	
32	Rebecca MacIntosh	Canadian Army Medical Corps	9th Canadian General Hospital	26	March 7, 1919			Flintshire, United Kingdom	
33	Margaret Christine MacLeod	Canadian Army Medical Corps		32	December 20, 1919			Nova Scotia, Canada	
34	Agnes MacPherson	Canadian Army Nursing Service	RRC 3 Stationary Hospital	27	May 30, 1918		Killed during a bombing raid	Etaples, France	
35	Jessie Mabel McDiarmid	Canadian Army Medical Corps	5 General Hospital		June 27, 1918		Drowning	Hospital Ship HMHS Llandovery Castle	
36	Rebecca Ellen McEachen	Canadian Army Medical Corps		32	November 16, 1918			Ontario, Canada	
37	Evelyn Verrall McKay	Canadian Army Medical Corps	3 General Hospital	25	November 4, 1918		Died of pneumonia	Boulogne, France	
38	Mary Agnes McKenzie	Canadian Army Medical Corps		38	June 27, 1918		Drowning	Hospital Ship HMHS Llandovery Castle	
39	Rena McLean	Canadian Army Medical Corps	2 Stationary Hospital		June 27, 1918		Drowning	Hospital Ship HMHS Llandovery Castle	
40	Henrietta Mellett	Canadian Army Medical Corps	15 General Hospital	34	October 10, 1918		Drowned when ship was torpedoed	In the Irish Sea when the RMS Leinster was sunk by SM UB-123	
41	Mary Frances Elizabeth Munro	Canadian Army Medical Corps	3 Stationary Hospital	49	September 7, 1915		Died of Dysentery	3 Stationary Hospital, Greece	
42	Grace Eleanor Boyd Nourse	Canadian Army Medical Corps		37	February 3, 1916			Quebec, Canada	
43	Eden Lyal Pringle	Canadian Army Nursing Service	3 Stationary Hospital	24	May 30, 1918		Killed during a bombing raid	Doullens, France	
44	Jean Ogilvie Alport (Roberts)	Canadian Army Medical Corps	4 General Hospital	32	November 13, 1918			Saskatchewan, Canada	
45	Nellie Grace Rogers	Canadian Army Medical Corps		28	October 19, 1918		Died of pneumonia	Davisville Hospital	
46	Elsie Gertrude Ross	Canadian Army Medical Corps		33	February 26, 1916		Died of pleuropneumonia	Ontario, Canada	
47	Ada Janet Ross	Canadian Army Medical Corps	1 General Hospital	50	July 12, 1918		Died of tuberculosis, peritonitis and pleurisy.	Derbyshire, United Kingdom	
48	Mary Belle Sampson	Canadian Army Medical Corps			June 27, 1918		Drowning	Hospital Ship HMHS Llandovery Castle	
49	Gladys Irene Sare	Canadian Army Medical Corps			June 27, 1918		Drowning	Hospital Ship HMHS Llandovery Castle	
50	Letitia "Etta" Sparks	Canadian Army Medical Corps	7 General Hospital	38	August 20, 1917		Died of cancer	Kitchener Military Hospital, Brighton, England	
51	Anna Irene Stamers	Canadian Army Medical Corps			June 27, 1918		Drowning	Hospital Ship HMHS Llandovery Castle	
52	Jean Templeman	Canadian Army Medical Corps			June 27, 1918		Drowning	Hospital Ship HMHS Llandovery Castle	
53	Alice Louise Trusdale	Canadian Army Medical Corps		26	September 12, 1919			Ontario, Canada	
54	Addie Allen (Adruenna) Tupper	Canadian Army Medical Corps	2 General Hospital	46	December 9, 1916		Died of pneumonia	Middlesex, United Kingdom	
55	Pearson Twist	Canadian Military V.A.D.		33	September 26, 1918				
56	Gladys Maude Mary Wake	Canadian Army Nursing Service	1 General Hospital	34	May 21, 1918		Died of wounds	Etaples, France	
57	Anna Elizabeth Whitely	Canadian Army Nursing Service	10 Stationary Hospital	46	April 21, 1918			Boulogne, France	

== Other Allied nations ==
Out of the 3,141 nurses who served during World War I, 53 died. Below are other nations and their nurse casualties.

Nationality	Number of nurses killed	Notes	Total nurses enlisted	References
Australia	29	29 Australian nurses died from disease or injuries; 25 of these died on active service, and 4 died in Australia from injuries or illness sustained during their service	2562 (Officially 2139 nurses served overseas and 423 in Australia but as many as 5000 may have served according to some reports.)	
New Zealand	16	16 New Zealand nurses died during the war, including 10 who died in the sinking of the hospital ship SS Marquette.	550	

== See also ==
- List of nurses who died in World War I

== Bibliography ==
Notes

References

- Veterans Affairs Canada - Alpaugh (2022). "Nursing Sister Agnes Estelle Alpaugh". Government of Canada.
- Veterans Affairs Canada - Baldwin (2022). "Nursing Sister Dorothy Mary Yarwood Baldwin". Government of Canada.
- Veterans Affairs Canada - M Baker (2022). "Margaret Elisa Baker". Government of Canada.
- Veterans Affairs Canada - Baker (2022). "Nursing Sister Miriam Eastman Baker". Government of Canada.
- Veterans Affairs Canada - Bartlett (2022). "Nurse Bertha Bartlett". Government of Canada.
- CBC Radio (June 15, 2018). "Canadian nurses killed in WWI hospital ship sinking commemorated in opera". CBC Radio.
- Veterans Affairs Canada - Champagne (2022). "Nursing Sister Ernestine Champagne". Government of Canada.
- Veterans Affairs Canada - Dagg (2022). "Nursing Sister Ainslie St Clair Dagg". Government of Canada.
- Veterans Affairs Canada - Davis (2022). "Nursing Sister Lena Aloa Davis". Government of Canada.
- Veterans Affairs Canada - Forneri (2022). "Nursing Sister Agnes Florien Forneri". Government of Canada.
- Veterans Affairs Canada - Frederickson (2022). "Nursing Sister Christine Frederickson". Government of Canada.
- Veterans Affairs Canada - Garbutt (2022). "Nursing Sister Sarah Ellen Garbutt". Government of Canada.
- Veterans Affairs Canada - Grant (2022). "Nursing Sister Grace Mabel Grant". Government of Canada.
- Veterans Affairs Canada - Green (2022). "Nursing Sister Matilda Ethel Green". Government of Canada.
- Habkirk, Evan J.; Farrugia, Peter (2021). Portraits of Battle: Courage, Grief, and Strength in Canada's Great War. University of British Columbia Press. ISBN 9780774864947. - Total pages: 328
- Harvey, Eliza (August 4, 2014). "World War I: Thousands of Australian nurses missed out on recognition". ABC News.
- Veterans Affairs Canada - Hennan (2022). "Nursing Sister Victoria Belle Hennan". Government of Canada.
- Veterans Affairs Canada - Hunt (2022). "Nursing Sister Myrtle Margaret Hunt". Government of Canada.
- Veterans Affairs Canada - Jaggard (2022). "Matron Jessie Brown Jaggard". Government of Canada.
- Veterans Affairs Canada - Jarvis (2022). "Nursing Sister Jessie Jarvis". Government of Canada.
- Veterans Affairs Canada - Kealy (2022). "Nursing Sister Ida Lilian Kealy". Government of Canada.
- Veterans Affairs Canada - King (2022). "Nursing Sister Jessie Nelson King". Government of Canada.
- Veterans Affairs Canada - MacPherson (2022). "Nursing Sister Agnes MacPherson". Government of Canada.
- Veterans Affairs Canada - McDougall (2022). "Nursing Sister Agnes McDougall". Government of Canada.
- Veterans Affairs Canada - McEachen (2022). "Nursing Sister Rebecca Ellen McEachen". Government of Canada.
- Veterans Affairs Canada - MacIntosh (2022). "Nursing Sister Rebecca MacIntosh". Government of Canada.
- Veterans Affairs Canada - MacLeod (2022). "Nursing Sister Margaret Christine MacLeod". Government of Canada.
- Veterans Affairs Canada - Mellett (2022). "Nursing Sister Henrietta Mellett". Government of Canada.
- Veterans Affairs Canada - Munro (2022). "Nursing Sister Mary Frances Elizabeth Munro". Government of Canada.
- New Zealand History (September 15, 2021). "New Zealand Army Nursing Service". Ministry for Culture and Heritage.
- Veterans Affairs Canada - Nourse (2022). "Nursing Sister Grace Eleanor Boyd Nourse". Government of Canada.
- Veterans Affairs Canada - Petty (2022). "Nursing Sister Gertrude Donaldson (Petty)". Government of Canada.
- Veterans Affairs Canada - Pringle (2022). "Nursing Sister Eden Lyal Pringle". Government of Canada.
- Veterans Affairs Canada (March 29, 2017). "The Nursing Sisters of Canada". Government of Canada.
- Veterans Affairs Canada - Roberts (2022). "Jean Ogilvie Alport (Roberts)". Government of Canada.
- Veterans Affairs Canada - Rogers (2022). "Nursing Sister Nellie Grace Rogers". Government of Canada.
- Veterans Affairs Canada - Ross (2022). "Nursing Sister Ada Janet Ross". Government of Canada.
- Veterans Affairs Canada - E Ross (2022). "Nursing Sister Elsie Gertrude Ross". Government of Canada.
- Veterans Affairs Canada - Sparks (2022). "Nursing Sister Letitia Sparks". Government of Canada.
- Veterans Affairs Canada - Trusdale (2022). "Nursing Sister Alice Louise Trusdale". Government of Canada.
- Veterans Affairs Canada - Tupper (2022). "Nursing Sister Addie Allen (Adruenna) Tupper". Government of Canada.
- Veterans Affairs Canada - Twist (2022). "Nurse Dorothy Pearson Twist". Government of Canada.
- Veterans Affairs Canada - Wake (2022). "Nursing Sister Gladys Maude Mary Wake". Government of Canada.
- Veterans Affairs Canada - Whitely (2022). "Nursing Sister Anna Elizabeth Whitely". Government of Canada.
- Witton, Dr Vanessa; Hillier, Dr Kathryn (August 16, 2021). "Nursing History". RPA Museum.
