= List of shipwrecks of France =

This is a list of shipwrecks located in or off the coast of France.

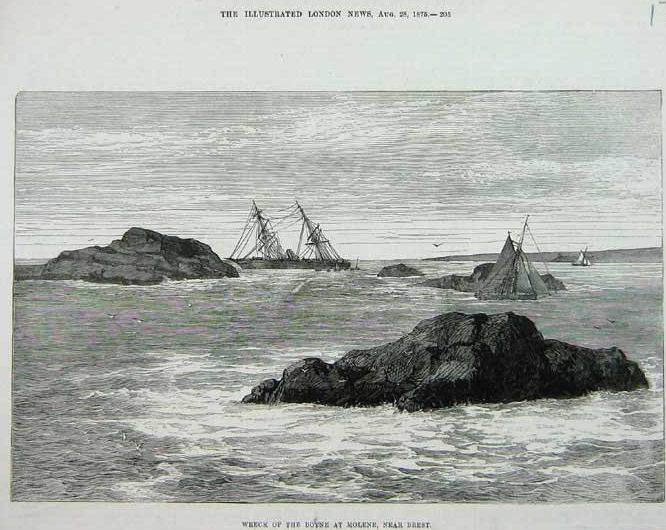
The shipwreck of Boyne off the Îles Molène, Brittany, 1875

== Aquitaine ==
Ship	Flag	Sunk date	Notes	Coordinates
U-180	Kriegsmarine	23 August 1944	A Type IXD1 U-boat sunk off Soorts-Hossegor.	44.000°N 2.000°W

== Brittany ==
Ship	Flag	Sunk date	Notes	Coordinates
Ajax	Denmark	25 December 1917	A cargo ship that was torpedoed by U-104 south of Audierne.	47°53′N 4°32′W
HMS Amazon	Royal Navy	14 January 1797	A frigate that ran aground at Audierne.	
HMS Amfitrite	Royal Navy	4 March 1807	A frigate wrecked off Ushant.	
Amoco Cadiz	Liberia	16 March 1978	A supertanker that ran aground at Portsall, causing an oil spill.	48.6°N 4.7°W
HMS Arethusa	Royal Navy	19 March 1779	A Royal Navy frigate, wrecked off Ushant after sustaining considerable damage in a battle with the French ship Aigrette.	48°27′4″N 5°4′4″W
Asgard II	Ireland	11 September 2008	A brigantine that sank off Belle Île.	47°18′03″N 3°33′02″W
HMCS Athabaskan	Royal Canadian Navy	29 April 1944	A Tribal-class destroyer that was torpedoed by T24 off Plouguerneau.	48°43′N 4°32′W
Auguste	French Navy	29 January 1795	A ship of the line caught in a tempest off Brest.	
Böhlen	East Germany	14 October 1976	An oil tanker that sank after going aground off the Île de Sein	48°10′30″N 5°10′48″W
HMS Charybdis	Royal Navy	23 October 1943	A Dido-class cruiser that was sunk by German torpedo boats off the north coast of Brittany.	48°59′N 3°39′W
Droits de l'Homme	France	1797	A ship of the line sunk after going aground off Plozévet.	
Empire Conyngham	United Kingdom	20 June 1949	A cargo ship that was scuttled off Brest.	47°52′N 8°51′W
Erika	Malta	12 December 1999	An oil tanker that sank in the Bay of Biscay, causing an oil spill.	47°9′N 4°15′W
HMS Firm	Royal Navy	29 June 1811	A gun-brig wrecked off Cancalle Bay.	
France	French Navy	26 August 1922	A Courbet-class battleship that struck a rock in Quiberon Bay.	47°27′6″N 3°2′0″W
USS Gypsum Queen	United States Navy	28 April 1919	A tugboat that struck a rock off Brest.	
Hilda	United Kingdom	18 December 1905	A steamship that hit the Pierre de Portes rocks in thick fog and sank off Saint-Malo.	48°40.49′N 2°5.72′W
London	United Kingdom	11 January 1864	Sunk in a storm in the Bay of Biscay.	
HMS Magnificent	Royal Navy	25 March 1804	A Ramillies-class ship of the line that struck a reef off Brest.	
HMS Monkey	Royal Navy	25 December 1810	A gun-brig wrecked on Belle Île while participating in the blockade of Lorient.	
Neptune	French Navy	28 December 1794	A ship of the line wrecked off Brest during the Croisière du Grand Hiver.	
HMS Repulse	Royal Navy	10 March 1800	An Intrepid-class ship of the line abandoned in the Glénan islands.	
Royal Louis	French Navy	24 December 1794	A ship of the line that ran aground off Brest.	
Saint-Esprit	French Navy	30 January 1795	A Saint-Esprit-class ship of the line wrecked off Brest during Croisière du Grand Hiver.	
Séduisant	French Navy	16 December 1796	A Séduisant-class ship of the line wrecked off Brest.	
Superbe	French Navy	30 January 1795	A Téméraire-class ship of the line wrecked off Brest during the Croisière du Grand Hiver.	
U-103	Imperial German Navy	12 May 1918	A German submarine that was rammed by RMS Olympic off Brest.	49°16′N 4°51′W
U-171	Kriegsmarine	9 October 1942	A Type IXC U-boat that was sunk near Lorient.	47°39′N 03°34′W
U-441	Kriegsmarine	8 June 1944	A Type VIIC U-boat that was sunk off Ushant.	48°27′N 05°47′W
U-526	Kriegsmarine	14 April 1943	A Type IXC/40 U-boat that was sunk by naval mines near Lorient.	47°30′N 03°45′W
U-767	Kriegsmarine	18 June 1944	A Type VIIC U-boat that was sunk by British destroyers north of Tréguier.	49°03′N 03°13′W
U-821	Kriegsmarine	10 June 1944	A Type VIIC U-boat that was sunk by aircraft off Ushant.	48°31′N 05°11′W
UC-36	Imperial German Navy	21 May 1917	A German Type UC II U-boat that was rammed by French steamer Molière off Ushant.	48°42′N 05°14′W

== Channel Islands ==
Ship	Flag	Sunk date	Notes	Coordinates
HMS Affray	Royal Navy	16 April 1951	An Amphion-class submarine lost near Hurds Deep.	49°30′N 3°34′W
Baden	Royal Navy	16 August 1921	A Bayern-class dreadnought sunk as a target in Hurd Deep.	49°49′42″N 2°23′21″W
HMS Dragon	Royal Navy	15 March 1712	A frigate that served in the Anglo-Dutch Wars, and was wrecked near Guernsey.	
HMS Lady Olive	Royal Navy	19 February 1917	A Q ship that was sunk by UC-18 west of Jersey.	49°15′N 02°34′W
Stella	United Kingdom	30 March 1899	A passenger ferry that hit a granite reef off the Casquets.	
UC-18	Imperial German Navy	19 February 1917	A German minelaying submarine sunk by Q ship Lady Olive west of Jersey.	49°15′N 02°34′W

== Corsica ==
Ship	Flag	Sunk date	Notes	Coordinates
HMS Fleche	Royal Navy	12 November 1795	A corvette that ran aground and capsized in the bay of Saint-Florent.	
HMS Saracen	Royal Navy	14 August 1943	An S-class submarine that was attacked by Italian corvettes and scuttled off Bastia.	42°45′N 9°30′E

== Languedoc-Roussillon ==
Ship	Flag	Sunk date	Notes	Coordinates
Wreck of Rochelongue			A shipwreck found west of Cap d'Agde dating to the Iron Age, around 600 BC.	

== Nord-Pas-de-Calais ==
Ship	Flag	Sunk date	Notes	Coordinates
Abukir	United Kingdom	28 May 1940	A steamship that was torpedoed by S-34 northeast of Calais, while evacuating soldiers and civilians from Ostend.	51.20°N 2.16°E
HMS Assistance	Royal Navy	29 March 1802	A fourth-rate ship that hit a sandbank off Dunkirk.	
Elizabeth		28 December 1810	A cargo ship wrecked on the Dunkirk brake, with at least 380 deaths.	
HMS Grenade	Royal Navy	29 May 1940	A G-class destroyer that was sunk by German Stuka dive bomber aircraft during the Battle of Dunkirk.	51°24′28″N 2°49′10″E
HMS Havant	Royal Navy	1 June 1940	A H-class destroyer that was scuttled after taking damage in the Battle of Dunkirk.	51°08′00″N 2°15′49″E
HMS Hermes	Royal Navy	31 October 1914	A Highflyer-class cruiser torpedoed by German submarine U-27.	51°06′18″N 1°50′18″E
Huntley	United Kingdom	21 November 1915	A German hospital ship seized by the Royal Navy, and torpedoed by UB-10 off Boulogne.	
HMS Keith	Royal Navy	1 June 1940	A B-class destroyer sunk at Dunkirk by enemy aircraft.	51°04′46″N 02°26′47″E
L'Adroit	French Navy	25 May 1940	A L'Adroit-class destroyer that was bombed by German aircraft off Dunkirk.	51°03′N 2°23′E
HMS Laforey	Royal Navy	23 March 1917	A Laforey-class destroyer that hit a naval mine off Cap Gris Nez.	
U-109	Imperial German Navy	26 January 1918	A German submarine sunk in the English Channel.	50°53′N 1°31′E
UC-26	Imperial German Navy	8 May 1917	A German minelaying submarine rammed by HMS Milne off Calais.	51°03′N 01°40′E
UC-61	Imperial German Navy	26 July 1917	A German minelaying submarine stranded and scuttled off Boulogne.	50°53′N 01°33′E
UC-79	Imperial German Navy	1918	A German minelaying submarine sunk by a mine off Cap Gris Nez.	

== Normandy ==
Ship	Flag	Sunk date	Notes	Coordinates
CSS Alabama	Confederate States Navy	11 June 1864	A screw sloop-of-war sunk off Cherbourg-Octeville during the American Civil War.	49°45′09″N 1°41′42″W
Amsterdam	Royal Navy	7 August 1944	A hospital ship that was sunk by a naval mine while taking casualties from Juno Beach.	
HMS Berkeley	Royal Navy	19 July 1942	A Hunt-class destroyer that was damaged by German bomber aircraft and scuttled off Dieppe.	49°59′N 01°02′E
HMS Britomart	Royal Navy	27 August 1944	A Halcyon-class minesweeper that was, along with HMS Hussar, accidentally sunk by Royal Air Force Hawker Typhoon aircraft off Le Havre.	
HMS Capel	Royal Navy	26 December 1944	A Captain-class frigate that was torpedoed by U-486 off Cherbourg.	49°50′N 1°41′W
HMS Centurion	Royal Navy	7 June 1944	A King George V-class battleship sunk as a breakwater off Avranches.	
USS Corry	United States Navy	6 June 1944	A Gleaves-class destroyer sunk off Îles Saint-Marcouf during the invasion of Normandy.	49°30′50″N 1°11′30″W
HMS D3	Royal Navy	12 March 1918	A D-class submarine that was mistakenly bombed by a French airship off Fecamp.	
HMS Daffodil	Royal Navy	18 March 1945	A train ferry that was requisitioned by the Royal Navy as an amphibious warfare ship, and was sunk by a naval mine off Dieppe.	50°02′N 01°04′E
Derrycunihy	United Kingdom	24 June 1944	A troopship that was sunk by a naval mine off Sword Beach.	
HMS Derwent	Royal Navy	2 May 1917	A River-class destroyer sunk off Le Havre by a naval mine laid by German submarine UC-26.	49°30′48″N 0°1′48″W
ORP Dragon	Polish Navy	7 July 1944	A Danae-class cruiser that was transferred to the Polish Navy and then scuttled near Courseulles.	
HMS Durban	Royal Navy	9 June 1944	A Danae-class light cruiser that was scuttled as a breakwater off Ouistreham.	49°20′44″N 00°16′08″W
USS Eastern Shore	United States Navy	4 August 1944	A cargo ship sunk to form part of a Mulberry harbour.	
HMS Eden	Royal Navy	18 June 1916	A River-class destroyer that collided with SS France off Fécamp.	
Empire Broadsword	Royal Navy	July 1944	An infantry landing ship sunk by a naval mine off Normandy.	49°25′N 0°54′W
Empire Javelin	Royal Navy	28 December 1944	An infantry landing ship that was sunk in the English Channel.	50°5′N 1°0′W
Galeka	Royal Navy	28 October 1916	A hospital ship that struck a naval mine while entering Le Havre.	49°34′N 0°5′E
USS Glennon	United States Navy	10 June 1944	A Gleaves-class destroyer that hit a naval mine and was sunk by shore batteries in the Baie de la Seine.	
HMS Hussar	Royal Navy	27 August 1944	A minesweeper sunk by friendly fire off Le Havre, along with HMS Britomart.	
HMS Isis	Royal Navy	20 July 1944	An I-class destroyer sunk off the coast of Normandy.	
Komet	Kriegsmarine	14 October 1942	A German auxiliary cruiser sunk by British motor torpedo boats near La Hague.	49°44′0″N 1°32′0″W
La Combattante	Free French Naval Forces	23 February 1945	A Hunt-class destroyer that was used by the Free French Naval Forces, and sank off Normandy.	
HMHS Lanfranc	Royal Navy	17 April 1917	A hospital ship torpedoed by German submarine UB-40 off Le Havre.	50°06′36″N 0°07′12″E
Léopoldville	Belgium	24 December 1944	A former Belgian passenger liner converted to a transport ship, torpedoed 5 nautical miles (9.3 km) from the coast of Cherbourg-Octeville.	49°45′N 1°34′W
USS Miantonomah	United States Navy	25 September 1944	A cargo ship and minelayer sunk by a naval mine off Le Havre.	49°26′29″N 0°11′31″E
USS Partridge	United States Navy	11 June 1944	A Lapwing-class minesweeper sunk by German E-boats off Vierville-sur-Mer.	49°30′N 00°50′W
USS PC-1261	United States Navy	6 June 1944	A PC-461-class submarine chaser, and the first ship sunk during the invasion of Normandy.	49°30′N 01°10′W
Pennsylvanian	United States	16 July 1944	A cargo ship scuttled to form part of a Mulberry harbour.	49°22′29″N 0°53′31″W
HMS Pylades	Royal Navy	8 July 1944	A Catherine-class minesweeper sunk off Juno Beach.	49°25′36″N 00°15′04″W
HMS Quorn	Royal Navy	3 August 1944	A Hunt-class destroyer sunk off the coast of Normandy.	
USS Rich	United States Navy	8 June 1944	A Buckley-class destroyer escort that hit three naval mines off Îles Saint-Marcouf.	49°31′N 1°10.6′W
HMHS Salta	Royal Navy	10 April 1917	A hospital ship that hit a mine laid by UC-26 off Le Havre.	49°32′8″N 0°2′18″W
HMS Shannon	Royal Navy	10 December 1803	A frigate wrecked off Tatihou.	
Soleil Royal	French Navy	3 June 1692	A ship of the line beached at Cherbourg and destroyed by fireships.	
USS Susan B. Anthony	United States Navy	7 June 1944	A transport ship sunk by a mine off Normandy; all 2,689 people aboard were rescued.	49°29′24″N 0°42′48″W
HNoMS Svenner	Royal Norwegian Navy	6 June 1944	An S-class destroyer that served in the Royal Norwegian Navy, and was sunk off Sword Beach.	49°27′N 0°15′W
USS Tide	United States Navy	7 June 1944	An Auk-class minesweeper sunk by a naval mine off Îles Saint-Marcouf.	49°36′59″N 1°4′59″W
Train Ferry No. 2	Royal Navy	13 June 1940	A train ferry that was requisitioned by the Royal Navy as an amphibious warfare ship, and was sunk by German gunfire off Sainte-Marguerite-sur-Mer.	49°56′N 00°56′E
U-151	Royal Navy	7 June 1921	A German submarine sunk as a target at Cherbourg.	
UC-78	Imperial German Navy	9 May 1918	A German minelaying submarine rammed by off Cherbourg.	49°49′N 01°40′W
HMAT Warilda	Royal Australian Navy	3 August 1918	An Australian hospital ship torpedoed by the U-boat UC-49 off Le Havre.	
West Cheswald	United States Navy	11 June 1944	A cargo ship scuttled off Utah Beach as a breakwater.	
West Grama	United States Navy	8 June 1944	A cargo ship scuttled off Omaha Beach as a breakwater.	
West Honaker	United States Navy	8 June 1944	A cargo ship scuttled off Utah Beach as a breakwater.	
West Nohno	United States Navy	11 June 1944	A cargo ship scuttled off Utah Beach as a breakwater.	
White Ship		25 November 1120	A 12th century vessel that sank in the English Channel near the Normandy coast off Barfleur.	

== Pays de la Loire ==
Ship	Flag	Sunk date	Notes	Coordinates
HMS Alcmene	Royal Navy	29 April 1809	An Alcmene-class frigate wrecked off Nantes.	
USS Buchanan	United States Navy	29 March 1942	A Wickes-class destroyer that was deliberately blown up in the St Nazaire Raid.	47°16′34″N 2°11′49″W
Héros	French Navy	21 September 1759	A ship of the line wrecked off Le Croisic.	
RMS Lancastria	United Kingdom	17 June 1940	A Cunard Liner sunk in the Loire River estuary during World War II.	47°10′26″N 2°19′15″W
Sachsenwald	Kriegsmarine	6 August 1944	A German weather ship that was sunk by a British convoy off Île d'Yeu.	
Saint-Philibert	France	14 June 1931	A cruise ship that sank off the Île de Noirmoutier, resulting in the death of nearly 500 passengers.	
U-51	Kriegsmarine	20 August 1940	A Type VIIB U-boat torpedoed by HMS Cachalot off Saint-Nazaire.	47°06′N 04°51′W
U-268	Kriegsmarine	19 February 1943	A Type VIIC U-boat sunk by depth charges off Nantes.	47°03′N 05°56′W
U-736	Kriegsmarine	6 August 1944	A Type VIIC U-boat sunk by HMS Loch Killin off Saint-Nazaire.	47°19′N 4°16′W

== Poitou-Charentes ==
Ship	Flag	Sunk date	Notes	Coordinates
HMS Atalante	Royal Navy	12 February 1807	A brig-sloop wrecked off Île de Ré.	
U-107	Kriegsmarine	18 August 1944	A Type IXB U-boat sunk by depth charges off La Rochelle.	46°46′N 03°49′W
U-263	Kriegsmarine	20 January 1944	A Type VIIC U-boat that was sunk during a deep dive trial off La Rochelle.	46°06′N 01°36′W
U-667	Kriegsmarine	25 August 1944	A Type VIIC U-boat that struck a mine off Oléron.	46°00′N 01°30′W

== Provence-Alpes-Côte d'Azur ==
Ship	Flag	Sunk date	Notes	Coordinates
Espingole	French Navy	4 February 1903	A Durandal-class destroyer that struck a rock near Cavalaire-sur-Mer.	43°09′20″N 06°36′30″E
Héros	French Navy	18 December 1793	A ship of the line that was scuttled by fire at Toulon.	
L'Indomptable	Vichy French Navy	27 November 1942	A Le Fantasque-class destroyer that was scuttled at Toulon to avoid capture (see Scuttling of the French fleet in Toulon).	
Madrague de Giens shipwreck		75–60 BCE	A Roman merchantman sunk off the coast of La Madrague de Giens, east of Toulon.	43°2′N 06°6′E
Magenta	French Navy	31 October 1875	An ironclad warship that exploded in the military harbour of Toulon.	
U-303	Kriegsmarine	21 May 1943	A Type VIIC U-boat that was torpedoed by HMS Sickle off Toulon.	42°50′N 06°00′E
