= U49 =

U49 may refer to:

- German submarine U-49, various vessels
- HMS Pheasant (U49), a sloop of the Royal Navy
- Small icosihemidodecahedron
- Small nucleolar RNA SNORD49
- Uppland Runic Inscription 49
- U49, a line of the Dortmund Stadtbahn
