= List of shipwrecks in November 1916 =

The list of shipwrecks in November 1916 includes ships sunk, foundered, grounded, or otherwise lost during November 1916.

== 1 November ==
List of shipwrecks: 1 November 1916
Ship	State	Description
Arthur James	United States	The schooner sank near Governor's Island in the harbor at Boston, Massachusetts.
Bernardo Canale	Italy	World War I: The cargo ship was sunk in the Mediterranean Sea 40 nautical miles (74 km) north west of Cape San Vito, Sicily (38°29′N 12°41′E) by SM U-21 (Imperial German Navy).
Brierley Hill	United Kingdom	World War I: The cargo ship was torpedoed and sunk in the North Sea 18 nautical miles (33 km) west north west of the Hellisøy Lighthouse, Hordaland, Norway by SM U-30 (Imperial German Navy). Her crew survived.
Ivanhoe	Norway	World War I: The cargo ship was sunk in the Barents Sea 30 nautical miles (56 km) north of Vardø, Finnmark by SM U-56 (Imperial German Navy). Her crew survived.
Marcia Bailey	United States	The schooner sank off Saybrook, Connecticut, after striking the Cornfield Shoal.
Seatonia	United Kingdom	World War I: The cargo ship was torpedoed and sunk in the Atlantic Ocean (80 nautical miles (150 km) north west of the Fastnet Rock (52°00′N 11°30′W) by SM U-49 (Imperial German Navy). Her crew survived.
Torero	Italy	World War I: The coaster was sunk in the Mediterranean Sea 6 nautical miles (11 km) off Capo Gallo, Sicily (38°30′N 13°28′E) by SM U-21 (Imperial German Navy). Her crew survived.
300	French Navy	World War I: The torpedo boat struck a mine and sank in the English Channel off Le Havre, Seine-Inférieure with the loss of twelve of her crew. by SM UC-26 (Imperial German Navy).

== 2 November ==
List of shipwrecks: 2 November 1916
Ship	State	Description
Caswell	United Kingdom	World War I: The trawler was shelled and sunk in the Atlantic Ocean 90 nautical miles (170 km) south west by west of the Fastnet Rock by SM U-49 (Imperial German Navy). Her crew survived.
Giovanni Anteri Beretta	Italy	World War I: The auxiliary schooner was sunk in the Mediterranean Sea off the coast of Spain (40°29′N 1°00′E) by SM U-34 (Imperial German Navy).
Harfat Castle	United Kingdom	World War I: The trawler was scuttled in the Atlantic Ocean 90 nautical miles (170 km) south west by west of the Fastnet Rock by SM U-49 (Imperial German Navy). Her crew survived.
Kyoto	United Kingdom	World War I: The trawler was shelled and sunk in the Atlantic Ocean 90 nautical miles (170 km) south west by west of the Fastnet Rock by SM U-49 (Imperial German Navy). Her crew survived.
Runhild	Sweden	World War I: The cargo ship was captured in the Baltic Sea (61°05′N 20°34′E) by SM U-22 (Imperial German Navy). A prize crew was put on board and they set sail for Libau, East Prussia, Germany. Runhild struck a mine and sank in the Åland Sea on 3 November. Her crew survived.
San Antonio O	Italy	World War I: The sailing vessel was sunk in the Mediterranean Sea north of Sicily by SM U-21 (Imperial German Navy).
Spero	United Kingdom	World War I: The cargo ship was torpedoed, shelled and sunk in the North Sea 95 nautical miles (176 km) west south west of the Hellisøy Lighthouse, Hordaland, Norway (59°34′N 1°52′E) by SM U-69 (Imperial German Navy). Survivors were rescued by USS Emeline (United States Navy).
Vanadis	Russia	World War I: The barquentine was sunk in the Baltic Sea (61°06′N 21°04′E) by SM U-22 (Imperial German Navy).

== 3 November ==
List of shipwrecks: 3 November 1916
Ship	State	Description
Ägir	Sweden	World War I: The coaster was sunk in the Gulf of Finland off Rauma, Finland by SM U-22 (Imperial German Navy). Her crew survived.
Bertha	Sweden	World War I: The barque was sunk in the North Sea east of the Shetland Islands, United Kingdom by SM U-69 (Imperial German Navy). Her crew survived.
Connemara	United Kingdom	The passenger ship collided with Retriever (United Kingdom) at the entrance to Carlingford Lough, County Louth. Both vessels sank with the loss of 97 lives. There was only one survivor, a crew member of Retriever.
Frans	Sweden	World War I: The coaster was sunk in the Gulf of Finland 14 nautical miles (26 km) off Rauma (61°03′N 20°33′E) by SM U-22 (Imperial German Navy). Her crew survived.
HMT Glenprosen	Royal Navy	World War I: The naval trawler struck a mine placed by SM UC-18 (Imperial German Navy) and sank in the North Sea 1 nautical mile (1.9 km) north north east of the Cross Sands Lightship (United Kingdom) with the loss of five of her crew.
Jönköping	Sweden	World War I: The sailing vessel, en route from Gävle to Raumo was sunk in the Baltic Sea by SM U-22 (Imperial German Navy. Her crew survived.
Ponus	United Kingdom	The tanker ran aground at Gyllyngvase, Cornwall and caught fire. Her crew were rescued.
San Giorgio	Italy	World War I: The brigantine was stopped and sunk in the Mediterranean Sea north of Sicily (38°16′N 10°57′E) by SM U-21 (Imperial German Navy).
Statesman	United Kingdom	World War I: The cargo ship was torpedoed and sunk in the Mediterranean Sea 200 nautical miles (370 km) east of Malta (36°00′N 18°30′E) by SM UB-43 (Imperial German Navy) with the loss of six of her crew.
Yatagan	French Navy	The Framée-class destroyer collided with Teviot (United Kingdom and sank in the English Channel off Dieppe Seine-Inférieure, France. (Some sources cite a date of loss of 4 November, suggesting that she sank overnight on 3–4 November 1916.)

== 4 November ==
List of shipwrecks: 4 November 1916
Ship	State	Description
Clan Leslie	United Kingdom	World War I: The cargo ship was torpedoed and sunk in the Mediterranean Sea 200 nautical miles (370 km) east of Malta (33°56′N 18°37′E) by SM UB-43 (Imperial German Navy) with the loss of three of her crew.
Esaern Svare	Denmark	The cargo ship caught fire in the English Channel and was abandoned by her crew.
Huntsvale	United Kingdom	World War I: The cargo ship was torpedoed and sunk in the Mediterranean Sea 200 nautical miles (370 km) east of Malta (36°04′N 19°03′E) by SM UB-43 (Imperial German Navy) with the loss of seven of her crew.
Mogador	France	World War I: The cargo ship was sunk in the Mediterranean Sea 38 nautical miles (70 km) north west of Punta Soller, Mallorca, Spain by SM U-34 (Imperial German Navy). Her crew survived.
Restitution	United Kingdom	This whale factory vessel was abandoned and sank off the Scilly Isles en route to South Georgia with whaling equipment.
Skerries	United Kingdom	World War I: The cargo ship struck a mine placed by SM U-80 (Imperial German Navy) and sank in the Irish Sea 15 nautical miles (28 km) north north west of The Skerries, Isle of Anglesey with the loss of two of her crew.
SM U-20	Imperial German Navy	SM U-20 The Type U 19 submarine ran aground at Vrist, Denmark. She was scuttled the next day.

== 5 November ==
List of shipwrecks: 5 November 1916
Ship	State	Description
HMT Cantatrice	Royal Navy	World War I: The naval trawler struck a mine placed by SM UC-18 (Imperial German Navy) and sank in the North Sea of Great Yarmouth, Norfolk with the loss of all eighteen crew.
HMT Knot	Royal Navy	The naval trawler was wrecked on the North Carr Rock, in the Firth of Forth.
Princess of Thule	United Kingdom	The schooner was wrecked in Mill Cove, Dartmouth, Devon with the loss of all hands.
Provençal 19	France	The 3-masted schooner Atlanti (Greece), in tow, ran aground on Maldivente Island, Sardinia; in manoeuvering to refloat her, the tug Provençal 19 struck a floating object, then sank as a result of taking on water.

== 6 November ==
List of shipwrecks: 6 November 1916
Ship	State	Description
Arabia	United Kingdom	World War I: The ocean liner was torpedoed and sunk in the Mediterranean Sea 300 nautical miles (560 km) east of Malta by SM UB-43 (Imperial German Navy) with the loss of eleven crew.
Chester A. Congdon	United States	The cargo ship capsized and sank in Lake Superior. Her crew were rescued.
Fanelly	France	World War I: The schooner was scuttled in the English Channel 18 nautical miles (33 km) west south west of Beachy Head, Sussex, United Kingdom by SM UC-17 (Imperial German Navy). Her six crew were rescued by W. H. Dyer (Canada).
James H. Hall	United States	While trying to enter the Thunder Bay River on the coast of Michigan in Lake Huron loaded with a cargo of lumber, the wooden schooner hit a pier and sank in 6 feet (1.8 m) of water at 45.0574°N 83.4294°W.
SM UB-45	Imperial German Navy	World War I: The Type UB II submarine struck a mine and sank in the Black Sea off Varna, Romania (43°12′N 28°09′E) with the loss of sixteen of her twenty crew. The wreck was raised in 1936.

== 7 November ==
List of shipwrecks: 7 November 1916
Ship	State	Description
SMS F2	Imperial German Navy	The F Type minesweeping boat was lost on this date.
Frieda	(Russian Empire) Grand Duchy of Finland	The barque was wrecked at South Rock, County Down, Ireland, United Kingdom.
Furulund	Norway	World War I: The cargo ship was scuttled in the English Channel 40 nautical miles (74 km) west north west of Cap la Hève, Seine Maritime, France by SM UC-17 (Imperial German Navy). Her crew survived.
Melanie	Imperial Russian Navy	World War I: The ship was sunk in the Black Sea off Cape Tarkhankut by SM UB-46 (Imperial German Navy).
Raymond	United States	The barge became waterlogged of San Luis Pass, Texas, eventually drifting on to rocks and breaking up, a total loss.
Reime	Norway	World War I: The cargo ship was sunk in the English Channel 51 nautical miles (94 km) south west of Dungeness, Kent, United Kingdom by SM UB-40 (Imperial German Navy). Her crew survived.
Suffolk Coast	United Kingdom	World War I: The coaster was scuttled in the English Channel 14 nautical miles (26 km) east south east of Cape Barfleur, Seine-Inférieure by SM UC-17 (Imperial German Navy). Her crew survived.
Thuhaug	Norway	World War I: The coaster was sunk in the English Channel 35 nautical miles (65 km) off Cap La Hève by SM UC-17 (Imperial German Navy). Her crew survived.

== 8 November ==
List of shipwrecks: 8 November 1916
Ship	State	Description
Columbian	United States	World War I: The cargo ship was captured and sunk with explosives in the Atlantic Ocean 50 nautical miles (93 km) north west of Cape Ortegal, Spain (44°18′N 9°20′W) by SM U-49 (Imperial German Navy). Her crew was transferred to Balto (Imperial German Navy), a captured Norwegian ship, then transferred to Varing (Sweden) when Balto was sent into A Coruña, Spain, and scuttled.
Killellan	United Kingdom	World War I: The collier was torpedoed and sunk in the English Channel 17 nautical miles (31 km) south west by south of the Colbart Lightship (France) by SM UB-40 (Imperial German Navy). Her crew survived.
Luigi Pastro	Italy	World War I: The cargo ship was sunk in the Strait of Sicily off Maritimo Island (37°48′N 11°37′E) by SM U-34 (Imperial German Navy).
Raimi	Russia	World War I: The cargo ship was sunk in the Gulf of Finland off Rauma, Finland by SM U-22 (Imperial German Navy).
Sheldrake	United Kingdom	World War I: The cargo ship was shelled and sunk in the Strait of Sicily off Maritimo Island (37°54′N 11°41′E) by SM U-34 (Imperial German Navy). Her crew survived, but two of them were taken as prisoners of war.
Vineyard	United Kingdom	World War I: The trawler struck a mine and sank in the North Sea 13 nautical miles (24 km) east south east of Aberdeen with the loss of nine of her crew.
HMS Zulu	Royal Navy	World War I: The Tribal-class destroyer struck a mine placed by SM UC-1 (Imperial German Navy) and broke in two in the North Sea off Gravelines, Pas-de-Calais, France with the loss of three of her 70 crew. The stern section sank. The bow section was towed to Calais and then Sheerness, Kent, United Kingdom where it was joined to the stern section of HMS Nubian to create HMS Zubian.

== 9 November ==
List of shipwrecks: 9 November 1916
Ship	State	Description
Balto	Imperial German Navy	World War I: The depot ship was scuttled in the Atlantic Ocean 70 nautical miles (130 km) north east of Cape Villano, Spain (43°00′N 9°00′W). Formerly a Norwegian cargo ship, she had been seized on 6 November by SM U-49 (Imperial German Navy).
HMS Fair Maid	Royal Navy	World War I: The minesweeper struck a mine placed by SM UC-18 (Imperial German Navy) and sank in the North Sea with the loss of five of her crew.
Fordalen	Norway	World War I: The cargo ship was scuttled in the Atlantic Ocean 50 nautical miles (93 km) north west of Cape Villano by SM U-49 (Imperial German Navy). Her crew was transferred to Balto (Imperial German Navy), a captured Norwegian ship, then transferred to Varing (Sweden) when Balto was sent into Corunna, Spain and scuttled.
Marga	United Kingdom	World War I: The coaster was sunk in the Atlantic Ocean 16 nautical miles (30 km) north by west of Ouessant, Finistère, France by SM UC-18 (Imperial German Navy). Her crew survived.
Sunniside	United Kingdom	World War I: The coaster struck a mine placed by SM UC-4 (Imperial German Navy) and sank in the North Sea 4 nautical miles (7.4 km) east north east of Southwold, Suffolk with the loss of four of her crew.

== 10 November ==
List of shipwrecks: 10 November 1916
Ship	State	Description
HMT Benton Castle	Royal Navy	World War I: The naval trawler struck a mine placed by SM UC-17 (Imperial German Navy) and sank in the English Channel off Dartmouth, Devon with the loss of ten of her crew.
Bogota	United Kingdom	World War I: The cargo ship was torpedoed and sunk in the Atlantic Ocean 120 nautical miles (220 km) south west of Ouessant, Finistère, France (46°51′N 6°54′W) by SM U-50 (Imperial German Navy). Her crew survived.
Camma	Norway	World War I: The coaster was sunk in the Atlantic Ocean 5 nautical miles (9.3 km) north west of the Segaras Lighthouse, Spain (43°17′N 9°09′W) by SM U-49 (Imperial German Navy). Her crew survived.
Chippewa	United States	The steamer stranded on Wings Neck, Massachusetts, in a gale. Later refloated.
Freja	Denmark	World War I: The cargo ship was sunk in the Mediterranean Sea 10 nautical miles (19 km) off Garrucha, Andalusia, Spain by SM U-64 (Imperial German Navy). Her crew survived.
H.M.W.	United Kingdom	World War I: The Thames barge struck a mine placed by SM UC-18 (Imperial German Navy) and sank in the English Channel 1 nautical mile (1.9 km) north by west of the Boulogne Lightship (France) with the loss of a crew member.
SMS S57	Imperial German Navy	World War I: The S49-class torpedo boat struck a mine in the Gulf of Finland and was consequently scuttled.
Tripel	Norway	World War I: The cargo ship was sunk in the Mediterranean Sea 5 nautical miles (9.3 km) off Garrucha by SM U-64 (Imperial German Navy). Her crew survived.
SMS V75	Imperial German Navy	World War I: The V67-class destroyer struck two mines and sank in the Gulf of Finland.

== 11 November ==
List of shipwrecks: 11 November 1916
Ship	State	Description
Anna I	Russia	World War I: The icebreaker struck a mine and sank in the White Sea.
Astrid	Sweden	World War I: The yacht was sunk in the Gulf of Finland off Rauma, Finland by SM U-22 (Imperial German Navy). Her crew survived.
Barbara	Greece	World War I: The cargo ship was sunk in the Atlantic Ocean north west of Cape Ortegal, Spain (45°02′N 8°34′W) by SM U-49 (Imperial German Navy). Her crew survived.
Daphne	Norway	World War I: The cargo ship was sunk in the English Channel 30 nautical miles (56 km) off Start Point, Devon, United Kingdom by SM UC-16 (Imperial German Navy). Her crew survived.
SMS G90	Imperial German Navy	World War I: The G85-class torpedo boat struck a mine and sank in the Gulf of Finland off Reval, Estonia.
Løkken	Norway	World War I: The cargo ship was sunk in the Atlantic Ocean 100 nautical miles (190 km) north of Cape Ortegal by SM U-50 (Imperial German Navy). Her crew survived.
Morazan	United Kingdom	World War I: The cargo ship was torpedoed and sunk in the Atlantic Ocean 145 nautical miles (269 km) south west by west of Ouessant (46°41′N 7°39′W) by SM U-50 (Imperial German Navy). Her crew survived, but her captain was taken as a prisoner of war.
Ragnar	Denmark	World War I: The cargo ship was sunk in the Atlantic Ocean 100 nautical miles (190 km) north of Cape Finisterre, Spain (44°56′N 8°38′W) by SM U-49 (Imperial German Navy). Her 21 crew were rescued by Leda (Netherlands).
SMS S58	Imperial German Navy	World War I: The S49-class torpedo boat struck a mine and sank in the Gulf of Finland off Reval.
SMS S59	Imperial German Navy	World War I: The S49-class torpedo boat struck a mine and sank in the Gulf of Finland off Reval.
Sarah Radcliffe	United Kingdom	World War I: The collier was torpedoed and sunk in the Atlantic Ocean 170 nautical miles (310 km) south west of Ouessant (46°00′N 7°00′W) by SM U-50 (Imperial German Navy). Her 28 crew were rescued by Hudin (Norway).
Seirstad	Norway	World War I: The coaster was sunk in the English Channel 10 nautical miles (19 km) south of the Longsands Lightship (United Kingdom) (49°57′N 5°38′W) by SM UC-17 (Imperial German Navy). Her crew survived.
SMS V72	Imperial German Navy	World War I: The V67-class destroyer struck a mine and sank in the Gulf of Finland off Reval.
SMS V76	Imperial German Navy	World War I: The V67-class destroyer struck a mine and sank in the Gulf of Finland off Reval.
Veronica	United Kingdom	World War I: The fishing smack was scuttled in the English Channel 9 nautical miles (17 km) south east of Start Point by SM UC-16 (Imperial German Navy). Her crew survived.

== 12 November ==
List of shipwrecks: 12 November 1916
Ship	State	Description
Ioannis	Greece	World War I: The cargo ship was sunk in the Atlantic Ocean 150 nautical miles (280 km) north of Cape Finisterre, Spain (45°30′N 7°20′W) by SM U-50 (Imperial German Navy).
Kapunda	United Kingdom	World War I: The cargo liner was torpedoed and sunk in the Mediterranean Sea 205 nautical miles (380 km) east south east of Malta (35°00′N 18°39′W) by SM UB-43 (Imperial German Navy). Her crew survived.
Lady Carrington	United Kingdom	World War I: The collier was torpedoed and sunk in the Atlantic Ocean 98 nautical miles (181 km) north west of Cape Ortegal, Spain (44°15′N 8°50′W) by SM U-49 (Imperial German Navy). Her crew survived.
San Giovanni	Italy	World War I: The cargo ship was sunk in the Atlantic Ocean 110 nautical miles (200 km) north of Cape Ortegal by SM U-50 (Imperial German Navy).
Stylinai Bebis	Greece	World War I: The cargo ship was sunk in the Atlantic Ocean 150 nautical miles (280 km) north of Cape Finisterre (45°20′N 7°30′W) by SM U-50 (Imperial German Navy).
Therese	Denmark	World War I: The cargo ship was sunk in the Atlantic Ocean of Cape Ortegal by SM U-49 (Imperial German Navy). Her crew survived.
William P. Hood	United States	The schooner was set afire and abandoned in the Atlantic Ocean (51°15′N 15°30′W). Her crew were rescued.

== 13 November ==
List of shipwrecks: 13 November 1916
Ship	State	Description
Bernicia	United Kingdom	World War I: The passenger ship was scuttled in the English Channel 20 nautical miles (37 km) south south east of Beachy Head, Sussex by SM UB-38 (Imperial German Navy). Her crew survived.
Caterham	United Kingdom	World War I: The cargo ship was scuttled in the English Channel 15 nautical miles (28 km) south south east of Beachy Head by SM UB-38 (Imperial German Navy). Her crew survived.
Corinth	United Kingdom	World War I: The collier was scuttled in the North Sea 28 nautical miles (52 km) south by east of Flamborough Head, Yorkshire (53°43′N 0°14′E) by SM UB-39 (Imperial German Navy). Her crew survived.
Diamond	Sweden	The wooden schooner was last heard from departing Drøbak bound for West Hartlepool. No information is available on the cause of her disappearance. Four casualties.
Lela	Italy	World War I: The cargo ship was shelled and sunk in the Atlantic Ocean south west of Ouessant, Finistère, France (47°08′N 9°16′W) by SM U-50 (Imperial German Navy). Her crew survived.
Lilloise	France	World War I: The schooner was scuttled in the Atlantic Ocean 12 nautical miles (22 km) west of Ouessant by SM UC-18 (Imperial German Navy). Her crew survived.
Marie Thérese	France	World War I: The schooner was sunk in the Bay of Biscay 32 nautical miles (59 km) south south west of Ar Men, Finistère (47°37′N 5°20′W) by SM UC-16 (Imperial German Navy).
Our Boys	United Kingdom	World War I: The fishing smack was shelled and sunk in the North Sea off the coast of Norfolk by SM UB-37 (Imperial German Navy). Her crew survived.
Riquette	France	World War I: The schooner was sunk in the English Channel 27 nautical miles (50 km) south of the Isle of Wight, United Kingdom (50°15′N 0°45′W) by SM UB-38 (Imperial German Navy).
Saint Nicolas	France	World War I: The sailing vessel was sunk in the English Channel 25 nautical miles (46 km) north of Fécamp, Seine-Inférieure by SM UB-38 (Imperial German Navy).
Superb	United Kingdom	World War I: The fishing smack was shelled and sunk in the North Sea off the coast of Norfolk by SM UB-37 (Imperial German Navy). Her crew survived.
William Thomas Moore	United Kingdom	The schooner was abandoned in the Atlantic Ocean (40°05′N 37°56′W). Her crew were rescued by Lowther Range (United Kingdom).

== 14 November ==
List of shipwrecks: 14 November 1916
Ship	State	Description
Alcyon	France	World War I: The schooner was sunk in the English Channel 25 nautical miles (46 km) north of Ouessant, Finistère by SM UC-17 (Imperial German Navy). Her crew survived.
Burdigala	France	World War I: The armed merchant cruiser, operating as a troopship, struck a mine and sank 2 nautical miles (3.7 km) off Kea, Greece (37°40′N 24°17′E with the loss of one life.
Hatsuse	United Kingdom	World War I: The trawler was shelled and sunk in the Atlantic Ocean 86 nautical miles (159 km) south west of the Fastnet Rock (50°14′N 11°00′W) by SM U-50 (Imperial German Navy). Her crew survived.
N.D. de Bon Secours	France	World War I: The sailing vessel was sunk in the Atlantic Ocean 10 nautical miles (19 km) south south west of the La Jument Lighthouse, Finistère by SM UC-16 (Imperial German Navy).
Nominoe	France	World War I: The three-masted schooner was sunk in the Atlantic Ocean 8 nautical miles (15 km) off Ar Men, Finistère by SM UC-16 (Imperial German Navy).
Oiz Mendi	Spain	World War I: The cargo ship was sunk in the Atlantic Ocean 54 nautical miles (100 km) south west of The Lizard, Cornwall, United Kingdom (49°09′N 5°15′W) by SM UC-17 (Imperial German Navy). Her crew survived.
Marie Caroussi	Greece	The cargo ship capsized off Jersey, Channel Islands. Eight survivors were rescued by Director (United Kingdom).
Polpedn	United Kingdom	World War I: The cargo ship was torpedoed and sunk in the English Channel 20 nautical miles (37 km) south of Littlehampton, Sussex by SM UB-38 (Imperial German Navy). Her crew survived.
Professeur Jalaguier	France	World War I: The brigantine was sunk in the English Channel 25 nautical miles (46 km) east north east of Barfleur, Manche by SM UB-38 (Imperial German Navy).
Salangane	France	World War I: The sailing vessel was sunk in the Atlantic Ocean 18 nautical miles (33 km) west south west of Ar Men by SM UC-16 (Imperial German Navy).
Ullvang	Norway	World War I: The coaster was sunk in the English Channel 30 nautical miles (56 km) off Cap la Hève, Seine-Inférieure, France (50°10′N 0°30′W) by SM UB-38 (Imperial German Navy). Her crew survived.
No. 4	Imperial Japanese Navy	The No. 1-class submarine sank in the Inland Sea of Japan (approximately 34°30′N 133°00′E) due to an internal gasoline explosion with the loss of two of her sixteen crew. She was later raised, repaired and returned to service.

== 15 November ==
List of shipwrecks: 15 November 1916
Ship	State	Description
Briantais	France	World War I: The barque was sunk in the Atlantic Ocean 200 nautical miles (370 km) west of Ouessant, Finistère by SM U-49 (Imperial German Navy). Her crew were rescued.
Crescendo	Canada	The schooner was run into by a trawler and sank at Queenstown, County Cork, Ireland.
F. Matarazzo	United Kingdom	World War I: The collier was torpedoed and sunk in the Mediterranean Sea 26 nautical miles (48 km) east north east of Linosa, Italy (35°05′N 13°20′E) by SM U-64 (Imperial German Navy). Her crew survived.
La Rochejacquelein	France	World War I: The three-masted barque was sunk in the Atlantic Ocean 15 nautical miles (28 km) west south west of The Lizard, Cornwall, United Kingdom by SM UC-17 (Imperial German Navy).
Lorca	United Kingdom	World War I: The cargo ship was sunk in the Atlantic Ocean 200 nautical miles (370 km) west of Ouessant by SM U-49 (Imperial German Navy) with the loss of all 32 crew.
Torridal	Norway	World War I: The coaster was sunk in the Atlantic Ocean 30 nautical miles (56 km) north east of Ouessant (48°50′N 4°39′W) by SM UC-17 (Imperial German Navy).
SM UC-15	Imperial German Navy	World War I: The Type UC I submarine was lost in the Black Sea during a minelaying operation near the Romanian port of Sulina, being sunk by her own mines. This was probably caused by an encounter with the torpedo boat Smeul (Royal Romanian Navy), whose captain surprised a German submarine near Sulina on 14–15 November 1916, the latter reportedly never returning to her base at Varna. This could only be UC-15, whose systems most likely malfunctioned after being forced to submerge in the shallow waters, upon encountering the Romanian torpedo boat.

== 16 November ==
List of shipwrecks: 16 November 1916
Ship	State	Description
Alphonse Marceline	Belgium	World War I: The fishing vessel was sunk in the English Channel off Cap d'Antifer, Seine-Inférieure, France by SM UB-40 (Imperial German Navy) with the loss of four crew.
Antelope	Sweden	The wooden barque was last heard from departing West Hartlepool bound for Uddevalla. No information is available on the cause of her disappearance. Ten casualties.
HMT Anthony Hope	Royal Navy	World War I: The naval trawler struck a mine placed by SM UC-26 (Imperial German Navy) and sank in the English Channel off Le Havre, Seine-Inférieure, France (49°31′N 0°02′W) with the loss of two of her crew.
Busy Bee	United Kingdom	The schooner was dismasted and abandoned at sea, drifting ashore on rocks 2 miles west of Bude, England.
Dolfijn	Netherlands	World War I: The sailing vessel was scuttled in the North Sea (56°50′N 4°20′E) by SM U-47 (Imperial German Navy). Her crew survived.
Eugenie	France	World War I: The sailing vessel was sunk in the English Channel 35 nautical miles (65 km) south of The Lizard, Cornwall, United Kingdom by SM UC-17 (Imperial German Navy).
Fenja	Denmark	World War I: The barque was sunk in the Baltic Sea 5 nautical miles (9.3 km) off Oxö, Sweden by SM U-75 (Imperial German Navy). Her crew survived.
Joachim Brinch Lund	Norway	World War I: The cargo ship was scuttled in the English Channel 60 nautical miles (110 km) east north east of Ouessant, Finistère, France (49°28′N 4°40′W) by SM UC-26 (Imperial German Navy) with the loss of nine of her crew.
Lelia	France	World War I: The sailing vessel was sunk in the English Channel 14 nautical miles (26 km) north west of the Île de Batz, Finistère by SM UC-16 (Imperial German Navy).
Parnas	Norway	World War I: The barque was scuttled in the North Sea (56°50′N 4°20′E) by SM U-47 (Imperial German Navy). Her crew survived.
Petit Jean	France	World War I: The sailing vessel was sunk in the English Channel 38 nautical miles (70 km) south of The Lizard (49°20′N 5°08′W) by SM UC-17 (Imperial German Navy). Her crew survived.
San Nicolao	Portugal	World War I: The cargo ship was sunk in the English Channel east north east of the Île de Batz (49°20′N 3°46′W) by SM UC-26 (Imperial German Navy).
Sunlight	United Kingdom	The coaster was abandoned in the Bristol Channel. Her crew were rescued.
SMS T29	Imperial German Navy	The S7-class torpedo boat collided with another vessel and sank off Cuxhaven, Lower Saxony.
Trevarrack	United Kingdom	World War I: The cargo ship was shelled and sunk in the English Channel 25 nautical miles (46 km) west of the Les Hanois Lighthouse, Guernsey, Channel Islands (49°40′N 3°48′W) by SM UC-18 (Imperial German Navy). Her crew survived.
Vanguard	United Kingdom	World War I: The ketch was scuttled in the English Channel 18 nautical miles (33 km) north west of Cap d'Antifer by SM UB-40 (Imperial German Navy). Her crew survived.
Vasco	United Kingdom	World War I: The cargo ship struck a mine placed by SM UC-16 (Imperial German Navy) and sank in the English Channel 10 nautical miles (19 km) west by south of Beachy Head, Sussex (50°43′N 0°02′W with the loss of seventeen of her crew.
Vega	Norway	World War I: The passenger ship was sunk in the North Sea 24 nautical miles (44 km) south west of Haaboen, Rogaland (58°43′N 4°45′E). Her crew survived.
Violet Courtney	United Kingdom	The schooner was wrecked in a gale at Ibiza, Spain. Her crew were rescued.
Wilf Golding	Denmark	The cargo ship collided with the barge Pure Oil (United States) at Philadelphia, Pennsylvania, and was consequently beached.

== 17 November ==
List of shipwrecks: 17 November 1916
Ship	State	Description
Canganian	France	World War I: The collier struck a mine placed by SM UC-29 (Imperial German Navy) and sank in the North Sea off Montrose, Forfarshire with the loss of thirteen of her crew.
Edward G. Hight	United States	The schooner ran aground in Belfast Lough. She was refloated on 16 December.
Emilia	Portugal	World War I: The barque was sunk in the Atlantic Ocean off the Canary Islands, Spain by SM UC-20 (Imperial German Navy).
Fred A. Davenport	United States	The schooner was driven ashore at Cape Frances, Dominican Republic and wrecked with some loss of life.
Mansuri	United Kingdom	The collier was lost on this date.
Monia	United Kingdom	The cargo ship foundered in the Irish Sea off Puffin Island, Anglesey. Her crew were rescued by the Moelfre Lifeboat.
Saint Rogatien	France	World War I: The barque was torpedoed, shelled and sunk in the English Channel off Dieppe, Seine-Inférieure (50°25′N 0°08′E) by SM UB-40 (Imperial German Navy) with the loss of five of her crew.
St. Christophe	France	The schooner was wrecked on the Cherrystones, in the Bristol Channel Her eight crew were rescued and the ship's dog survived. St. Christophe was on a voyage from Blaye, Gironde to Swansea, Glamorgan, United Kingdom.
T. A. Scott, Jr.	United States	The tug collided with the merchant submarine Deutschland (Germany) while escorting Deutschland from New London, Connecticut, to the open ocean and sank immediately with the loss of her entire crew of five, a total loss. Deutschland suffered no casualties but had to return to New London for repairs to her bow.
White Swan	United Kingdom	The cargo ship was driven ashore at Gorleston, Suffolk, England. Her twenty crew were rescued by rocket apparatus.

== 18 November ==
List of shipwrecks: 18 November 1916
Ship	State	Description
Fulvia	Denmark	The schooner foundered in Dundrum Bay with the loss of one of her seven crew.
Kenneth C.	United Kingdom	The schooner was driven ashore at Clogerhead, County Louth and was wrecked. Her crew were rescued.
Marie Celine	United Kingdom	The sailing vessel was driven ashore at Clogerhead and was wrecked. Her crew were rescued.
Minde	Norway	The barque was driven ashore at Craster, Northumberland, United Kingdom and wrecked with the loss of seven of her thirteen crew.
Shelton Abbey	United Kingdom	The schooner was driven ashore at Rosslare Harbour, County Wexford. Her crew were rescued.
Taffy	United Kingdom	The collier foundered off Waterford Harbour, County Waterford. Her crew were rescued.

== 19 November ==
List of shipwrecks: 19 November 1916
Ship	State	Description
Agnes	Denmark	The schooner was driven ashore at Berwick-upon-Tweed, Northumberland, United Kingdom. Her crew were rescued by rocket apparatus.
Bessheim	Norway	The passenger ship ran aground at the mouth of the River Tyne. All on board were rescued. She was refloated on 25 November.
Concezione	Italy	The cargo ship foundered in the Atlantic Ocean 12 nautical miles (22 km) off Fuerteventura, Canary Islands, Spain. Her 24 crew were rescued by a Spanish merchant vessel.
HMS Fame	Royal Navy	The Q-ship was lost on this date.
Finn	Norway	World War I: The cargo ship was sunk in the English Channel 40 nautical miles (74 km) west by south of Portland Bill, Dorset, United Kingdom (50°06′N 2°45′W) by SM UC-26 (Imperial German Navy). Her crew survived.
Freya	Denmark	The sailing vessel was driven ashore at Burnmouth, Berwickshire, United Kingdom and was wrecked with the loss of one of her six crew.
Heistad	Norway	The schooner was driven ashore at Montrose, Fife, United Kingdom and was wrecked. Her crew were rescued.
Jarstein	Norway	The schooner was driven ashore at Kingsbarns, Fife and was wrecked. Her crew were rescued.
Jolani	Sweden	The barque was wrecked at Goswick, Northumberland. Her crew were rescued.
Manga Reva	United States	The barque foundered with the loss of all hands.
Maria di Pompei	Italy	World War I: The barquentine was sunk in the Mediterranean Sea off Sicily (37°05′N 14°25′E) by SM U-72 (Imperial German Navy). Her crew survived, they were rescued by Tchad (France).
Muristan	United Kingdom	The cargo ship was driven ashore at Blyth, Northumberland and was wrecked with the loss of eighteen of her 32 crew.
Rurik	Imperial Russian Navy	World War I: The armoured cruiser struck a mine in the Baltic Sea off Gogland, and was seriously damaged. The ship was later repaired and returned to service.
Spica	Norway	The cargo ship was driven ashore at Blyth. Her crew were rescued.
Waterford	United Kingdom	The cargo ship foundered in the North Sea off the coast of Essex. Her crew were rescued.

== 20 November ==
List of shipwrecks: 20 November 1916
Ship	State	Description
Alma	Denmark	The schooner was driven ashore at Lunan, Forfarshire, United Kingdom and wrecked with the loss of one of her six crew.
Argus	Sweden	The barque was driven ashore at Peterhead, Aberdeenshire, United Kingdom. Her ten crew were rescued.
H. C. Grube	United Kingdom	The schooner was driven ashore at Montrose. Her crew were rescued. She was refloated on 23 November.
Maria Libera	Italy	The brig was wrecked at Marseille, Bouches-du-Rhône, France with the loss of all hands.
Rob Roy	United States	The four-masted schooner sprang a leak and foundered in the Atlantic Ocean 90 nautical miles (170 km) north east of Madeira, Portugal. Her crew survived.
Spetzai	Greece	World War I: The cargo ship struck a mine and sank at Piraeus. She was later refloated, repaired and returned to service.
Talisman	Sweden	The barque was driven ashore at East Haven, Forfarshire and was wrecked. Her ten crew were rescued.
Vanguard	United Kingdom	The tug foundered in the River Clyde at Govan, Renfrewshire.

== 21 November ==
List of shipwrecks: 21 November 1916
Ship	State	Description
Alameda	United Kingdom	The schooner was wrecked at El Puerto de Santa María, Cadíz, Spain.
Alice	France	World War I: The cargo ship was sunk in the English Channel 23 nautical miles (43 km) north west of Saint-Valery-en-Caux, Seine-Inférieure (50°20′N 0°38′E) by SM UB-40 (Imperial German Navy).
HMHS Britannic	United Kingdom	World War I: The hospital ship, a converted Olympic-class ocean liner, struck a mine in the Kea Channel 4 nautical miles (7.4 km) off Kea, Greece (37°42′05″N 24°17′02″E) and sank with the loss of 30 of the 1,066 people on board. Survivors were rescued by HMS Foresight, HMS Foxhound, HMS Heroic, HMS Scourge (all Royal Navy); the tug Goliath (France) and a Greek caïque.
Cap Lihou	France	World War I: The schooner was sunk in the English Channel 20 nautical miles (37 km) north west of Sept Îles, Finistère by SM UC-26 (Imperial German Navy).
Faunus	Sweden	World War I: The coaster struck a mine placed by SM UC-17 (Imperial German Navy) and sank in the North Sea 14 nautical miles (26 km) south by east of Flamborough Head, Yorkshire, United Kingdom. Six of her crew perished.
Florence E. Melanson	United Kingdom	The schooner was driven ashore on Briar Island, Nova Scotia, Canada. Her crew were rescued.
Helena	Netherlands	World War I: The cargo ship struck a mine and sank in the North Sea 5 nautical miles (9.3 km) south east of the Cross Sand Lightship (United Kingdom) (52°34′N 2°00′E).

== 22 November ==
List of shipwrecks: 22 November 1916
Ship	State	Description
Brierton	United Kingdom	World War I: The cargo ship was torpedoed and sunk in Atlantic Ocean 32 nautical miles (59 km) south west of Ouessant, Finistère, France (48°00′N 5°32′W) by SM UC-26 (Imperial German Navy). Her crew survived.
City of Mexico	Norway	World War I: The cargo ship was sunk in the English Channel 32 nautical miles (59 km) off Beachy Head, Sussex, United Kingdom by SM UB-40 (Imperial German Navy). Her crew survived.
Fugas	Imperial Russian Navy	World War I: The minesweeper struck a mine placed by SM UC-27 (Imperial German Navy) and sank off the coast of Finland with the loss of eight of her crew.
Grenada	United Kingdom	World War I: The four-masted barque was shelled and sunk in the English Channel 32 nautical miles (59 km) south west by west of Beachy Head (50°24′N 0°07′W) by SM UB-40 (Imperial German Navy). Her crew survived.
Houlgate	France	World War I: The cargo ship was sunk in the English Channel 23 nautical miles (43 km) south east of the Owers Lightship (United Kingdom) by SM UB-40 (Imperial German Navy). Her crew survived.
Sara	Norway	The barque was abandoned in the Atlantic Ocean (46°51′N 23°29′W).
Trym	Norway	World War I: The cargo ship was sunk in the Atlantic Ocean 9 nautical miles (17 km) west north west of Ar Men, Finistère by SM UC-26 (Imperial German Navy). Her crew survived.

== 23 November ==
List of shipwrecks: 23 November 1916
Ship	State	Description
Angelica Maersk	Denmark	The cargo ship collided with Cupica (United States) in the English Channel and was consequently beached at Sandgate, Kent, United Kingdom. She was refloated later that day.
Arthur	Sweden	World War I: The cargo ship was sunk in the Skaggerak 6 nautical miles (11 km) off Skagen, Denmark by SM U-75 (Imperial German Navy). Her crew survived.
Blue Book	United States	The barge sank, probably off Connecticut, after the tug John Garrett (flag unknown) lost her tow of barges, a total loss.
Blue Fish	United States	The barge sank, probably off Connecticut, after the tug John Garrett (flag unknown) lost her tow of barges, a total loss.
HMHS Braemar Castle	United Kingdom	World War I: The hospital ship struck a mine placed by SM U-73 (Imperial German Navy) and was damaged in the Mykoni Channel with the loss of four lives. She was beached but was later refloated.
C. and G. No. 112	United States	The scow sank, probably off Connecticut, after the tug John Garrett (flag unknown) lost her tow of barges, a total loss.
Dansted	Denmark	World War I: The cargo ship was sunk in the Atlantic Ocean 15 nautical miles (28 km) west of Ar Men, Finistère, France (49°01′N 5°32′W) by SM UC-26 (Imperial German Navy). Her crew survived.
Dorothy	United States	The barge sank, probably off Connecticut, after the tug John Garrett (flag unknown) lost her tow of barges, a total loss.
Edward Olney, Jr.	United States	The barge sank, probably off Connecticut, after the tug John Garrett (flag unknown) lost her tow of barges, a total loss.
Grandma	United States	The barge sank, probably off Connecticut, after the tug John Garrett (flag unknown) lost her tow of barges, a total loss.
Hendrick	France	World War I: The fishing vessel was sunk in the English Channel off Cap d'Antifer, Manche by SM UB-18 (Imperial German Navy).
Ida Woods	United States	The barge went ashore on Hunnewell Point near Buzzards Bay, Massachusetts.
John S. Thompson	United States	The barge sank, probably off Connecticut, after the tug John Garrett (flag unknown) lost her tow of barges, a total loss.
Margherita F.	Italy	World War I: The sailing vessel was sunk in the Tyrrhenian Sea by SM U-72 (Imperial German Navy).
Sarah T. Guinan	United States	The barge sank, probably off Connecticut, after the tug John Garrett (flag unknown) lost her tow of barges, a total loss.
St. Christophe	France	The schooner was wrecked at Mumbles, Glamorgan, United Kingdom.
W. F. Gilbert	United States	The barge sank, probably off Connecticut, after the tug John Garrett (flag unknown) lost her tow of barges, a total loss.

== 24 November ==
List of shipwrecks: 24 November 1916
Ship	State	Description
Anna	United States	The barge stranded on the western shore near Sandy Point in the harbor at New Haven, Connecticut.
HMT Dhoon	Royal Navy	World War I: The 125.4-foot (38.2 m), 275-ton minesweeping naval trawler struck a mine placed by SM UC-19 (Imperial German Navy) and sank in the North Sea off the Newarp Lightship (United Kingdom) with the loss of twelve of her crew.
Jerseyman	United Kingdom	World War I: The coaster was torpedoed and sunk in the English Channel south west of Beachy Head, Sussex by SM UB-19 (Imperial German Navy). Her crew survived.
John H. Ryerson	United States	The barge stranded on the western shore near Sandy Point in the harbor at New Haven, Connecticut. Refloated and returned to service.
Louise	United States	The barge stranded on the western shore near Sandy Point in the harbor at New Haven, Connecticut.
Øifjeld	Norway	World War I: The cargo ship was sunk in the English Channel north west of Pointe d'Ailly, Seine Maritime, France by SM UB-18 (Imperial German Navy). Her crew survived.
Padang	Norway	The barque ran aground on Molène, Finistère, France and was a total loss. Her crew were rescued.
William H. Clifford	United States	The schooner stranded off Montauk Point, New York. Refloated and returned to service.

== 25 November ==
List of shipwrecks: 25 November 1916
Ship	State	Description
Alfred De Courcy	France	World War I: The sailing vessel was sunk in the Atlantic Ocean 22 nautical miles (41 km) north north west of Ouessant, Finistère (48°50′N 5°05′W) by SM UC-26 (Imperial German Navy).
HMT Burnley	Royal Navy	World War I: The 125-foot (38 m), 275-ton steam minesweeping naval trawler struck a mine placed by SM UC-4 (Imperial German Navy) and sank in the North Sea off Orfordness, Suffolk with the loss of all nineteen crew.
Emlynverne	United Kingdom	World War I: The coaster was shelled and sunk in the English Channel 30 nautical miles (56 km) north west by north of Cap d'Antifer, Seine-Inférieure, France (49°57′N 0°30′W) by SM UB-18 (Imperial German Navy). Her crew survived.
Malvina	France	World War I: The sailing vessel was sunk in the Atlantic Ocean 15 nautical miles (28 km) off Ouessant (48°50′N 5°05′W) by SM UC-26 (Imperial German Navy).
Michael	Greece	World War I: The cargo ship was scuttled in the Mediterranean Sea 45 nautical miles (83 km) north of Cape Ténès, Algeria (37°12′N 0°18′E) by SM U-38 (Imperial German Navy).
Petra	Norway	The cargo ship ran aground on the Goodwin Sands, Kent, United Kingdom. Her crew were rescued by the Deal Lifeboat. Petra was refloated the next day.

== 26 November ==
List of shipwrecks: 26 November 1916
Ship	State	Description
Chemung	United States	World War I: The cargo ship was captured and sunk by torpedo and shelling in the Mediterranean Sea 14 nautical miles (26 km) east of Cabo de Gata, Andalusia, Spain by SM U-38 (Imperial German Navy). Her crew were rescued by Salvatore Giner (Spain).
Christoforos	Greece	World War I: The cargo ship was sunk in the Gulf of Genoa 25 nautical miles (46 km) south west of Genoa, Liguria, Italy by SM U-72 (Imperial German Navy).
HMT Finross	Royal Navy	World War I: The naval trawler struck a mine placed by SM UC-14 (Imperial German Navy) and sank in the Ionian Sea off Gallipoli, Apulia, Italy.
HMT Michaelmas Daisy	Royal Navy	World War I: The naval trawler struck a mine placed by SM UC-14 (Imperial German Navy) and sank in the Ionian Sea off Santa Maria di Leuca, Lecce, Italy with the loss of all eleven or all twelve of her crew.
Mira	Portugal	The cargo ship collided with Arundo (Netherlands) in the Atlantic Ocean off the coast of Spain and sank. Her crew were rescued by Arundo.
HMT Narval	Royal Navy	World War I: The naval trawler was sunk in the North Sea 9 nautical miles (17 km) north of the Shipwash Lightship (United Kingdom) by an Imperial German Navy destroyer. Her crew were taken as prisoners of war.
Romance	Norway	World War I: The barge was scuttled in the North Sea 100 nautical miles (190 km) east north east of the mouth of the River Tyne by SM UC-30 (Imperial German Navy).
Suffren	French Navy	World War I: The Suffren-class battleship was torpedoed, blew up, and sank in the Atlantic Ocean 90 nautical miles (170 km) west of Lisbon, Portugal (39°10′N 10°48′W) by SM U-52 (Imperial German Navy) with the loss of all 648 crew.

== 27 November ==
List of shipwrecks: 27 November 1916
Ship	State	Description
Belle Ile	Norway	World War I: The cargo ship was sunk in the English Channel 16 nautical miles (30 km) south west of Start Point, Devon, United Kingdom by SM UB-19 (Imperial German Navy). Her crew survived.
Borø	Norway	World War I: The coaster was sunk in the English Channel 20 nautical miles (37 km) north north west of Jersey, Channel Islands (49°35′N 3°04′W) by SM UB-18 (Imperial German Navy). Her crew survived.
Karnak	France	World War I: The passenger ship was sunk in the Mediterranean Sea 70 nautical miles (130 km) south south east of Valletta, Malta by SM U-32 (Imperial German Navy) with the loss of seventeen lives.
City of Birmingham	United Kingdom	World War I: The cargo liner was torpedoed and sunk in the Mediterranean Sea 90 nautical miles (170 km) south east of Malta (35°10′N 15°41′E) by SM U-32 (Imperial German Navy) with the loss of four lives. Survivors were rescued by HMHS Letitia (Royal Navy).
Margarita	Greece	World War I: The cargo ship was shelled and sunk in the Mediterranean Sea north west of Alexandria, Egypt (33°10′N 28°10′E) by SM U-39 (Imperial German Navy).
Maude Larssen	United Kingdom	World War I: The cargo ship was scuttled in the Strait of Sicily 22 nautical miles (41 km) west south west of Maritimo Island, Italy (37°59′N 11°34′E) by SM U-63 (Imperial German Navy). Her crew survived.
Perra	Norway	World War I: The cargo ship was sunk in the English Channel 8 nautical miles (15 km) north of the Casquets, Channel Islands (49°52′N 2°23′W) by SM UB-18 (Imperial German Navy). Her crew survived.
Reapwell	United Kingdom	World War I: The collier was torpedoed and sunk in the Mediterranean Sea 148 nautical miles (274 km) north west by north of Alexandria by SM U-39 (Imperial German Navy). Her crew survived, but her captain was taken as a prisoner of war.
Rhona	United Kingdom	World War I: The coaster was scuttled in the English Channel 19 nautical miles (35 km) north west by north of Guernsey, Channel Islands by SM UB-18 (Imperial German Navy). Her crew survived.
Salvatore Ciampa	Italy	World War I: The full-rigged ship was sunk in the Mediterranean Sea south east of Toulon, Var, France by SM U-72 (Imperial German Navy).
Visborg	Norway	World War I: The cargo ship was sunk in the English Channel 14 nautical miles (26 km) south east of Start Point, Devon by SM UB-19 (Imperial German Navy). Her crew survived.

== 28 November ==
List of shipwrecks: 28 November 1916
Ship	State	Description
Alert	United Kingdom	World War I: The coaster was scuttled in the English Channel 6 nautical miles (11 km) east north east of the Owers Lightship (United Kingdom) by SM UB-39 (Imperial German Navy). Her crew survived.
Alison	United Kingdom	World War I: The coaster was scuttled in the English Channel 8 nautical miles (15 km) east south east of the Owers Lightship (United Kingdom) (50°34′N 0°26′W) by SM UB-39 (Imperial German Navy). Her crew survived.
Amphitrite	United Kingdom	World War I: The fishing smack was shelled and sunk in the English Channel 24 nautical miles (44 km) west by south of Portland Bill, Dorset by SM UB-37 (Imperial German Navy). Her crew survived.
Arthur J. Parker	United Kingdom	The schooner was set afire and abandoned in the Atlantic Ocean. Her crew were rescued by Rockingham (flag unknown).
Auguste Marie	France	World War I: The sailing vessel was sunk in the English Channel about 30 nautical miles (56 km) north west of Ouessant, Finistère (48°58′N 5°05′W) by SM UB-18 (Imperial German Navy). Her crew survived; they were rescued by Grondeur (French Navy).
Catena	United Kingdom	World War I: The fishing smack was shelled and sunk in the English Channel 25 nautical miles (46 km) south west by south of Berry Head, Devon by SM UB-37 (Imperial German Navy). Her crew survived.
Clematis	United Kingdom	World War I: The fishing smack was scuttled in the English Channel 35 nautical miles (65 km) south east of Start Point, Devon by SM UC-21 (Imperial German Navy). Her crew survived.
Diligence	United Kingdom	World War I: The fishing ketch was sunk in the English Channel 25 nautical miles (46 km) off Berry Head by SM UB-37 (Imperial German Navy).
King Malcolm	United Kingdom	World War I: The cargo ship was torpedoed and sunk in the Mediterranean Sea 144 nautical miles (267 km) north west by north of Alexandria, Egypt by SM U-39 (Imperial German Navy). Her crew survived, but her captain was taken as a prisoner of war.
Lady of the Lake	United Kingdom	World War I: The ketch was shelled and sunk in the English Channel 35 nautical miles (65 km) south east of Start Point, Devon by SM UC-21 (Imperial German Navy). Her crew survived.
Lucienne	Spain	World War I: The cargo ship was sunk in the English Channel 35 nautical miles (65 km) north west of Ouessant by SM UB-18 (Imperial German Navy).
Moresby	United Kingdom	World War I: The cargo ship was torpedoed and sunk in the Mediterranean Sea 120 nautical miles (220 km) north west by north of Alexandria by SM U-39 (Imperial German Navy) with the loss of 33 crew.
HMT Pelagia	Royal Navy	World War I: The naval trawler struck a mine placed by SM UC-21 (Imperial German Navy) and sank in the English Channel off the Nab Lightship (United Kingdom) with the loss of twelve of her crew.
Provident	United Kingdom	World War I: The fishing smack was scuttled in the English Channel 24 nautical miles (44 km) west by south of Portland Bill by SM UB-37 (Imperial German Navy). Her crew survived.
Ramsgarth	United Kingdom	World War I: The cargo ship was scuttled in the English Channel 11 nautical miles (20 km) east by south of the Owers Lightship (United Kingdom) by SM UB-39 (Imperial German Navy). Her crew survived.
Sea Lark	United Kingdom	World War I: The fishing smack was shelled and sunk in the English Channel 25 nautical miles (46 km) south east of Berry Head by SM UB-37 (Imperial German Navy).
Sigurd	Denmark	World War I: The cargo ship was sunk in the Mediterranean Sea 15 nautical miles (28 km) off Cape Spartivento, Italy (38°34′N 8°44′E) by SM U-63 (Imperial German Navy). Her crew survived.
Vulcan	United Kingdom	World War I: The fishing smack was scuttled in the English Channel 28 nautical miles (52 km) south east by east of Berry Head by SM UC-21 (Imperial German Navy). Her crew survived.

== 29 November ==
List of shipwrecks: 29 November 1916
Ship	State	Description
Georgietta	United States	The schooner was abandoned in the Atlantic Ocean. Her crew were rescued by Borghild (flag unknown).
Grace	United Kingdom	World War I: The schooner was scuttled in the English Channel 40 nautical miles (74 km) south east of Start Point, Devon by SM UB-39 (Imperial German Navy). Her crew survived.
HMT Lord Airedale	Royal Navy	World War I: The naval trawler struck a mine placed by SM UC-11 (Imperial German Navy) and sank in the North Sea off the Sunk Lightship (United Kingdom) with the loss of seven of her crew.
Luciston	United Kingdom	World War I: The collier was torpedoed and sunk in the Mediterranean Sea 4 nautical miles (7.4 km) off Delimara Point, Malta by SM UC-22 (Imperial German Navy). Her crew survived.
Minnewaska	United Kingdom	World War I: The troopship struck a mine placed by SM UC-23 (Imperial German Navy) and was damaged in Suda Bay, Crete, Greece. She was beached but was declared a total loss.
Saint Philippe	France	World War I: The cargo ship was sunk in the English Channel 10 nautical miles (19 km) west south west of Guernsey, Channel Islands (49°25′N 3°06′W) by SM UB-39 (Imperial German Navy) with the loss of nine of her crew.

== 30 November ==
List of shipwrecks: 30 November 1916
Ship	State	Description
Arthur H. Wight	United Kingdom	The schooner was abandoned in the Atlantic Ocean. Her crew were rescued.
Aud	Norway	World War I: The cargo ship was torpedoed and sunk in the Atlantic Ocean (50°19′N 5°33′W) by SM UB-18 (Imperial German Navy). Her crew were rescued by Alu Mendi (Spain).
Behrend	United Kingdom	World War I: The schooner was scuttled in the English Channel 35 nautical miles (65 km) south west of Portland Bill, Dorset by SM UB-19 (Imperial German Navy). Her crew survived.
Christabel	United Kingdom	World War I: The sailing vessel was scuttled in the Atlantic Ocean 10 nautical miles (19 km) north by west of St. Ives, Cornwall (50°20′N 5°40′W) by SM UB-18 (Imperial German Navy). Her crew survived.
Concord	United Kingdom	World War I: The fishing smack was scuttled in the English Channel 28 nautical miles (52 km) south east of Start Point, Devon by SM UB-37 (Imperial German Navy). Her crew survived.
Draupner	Norway	World War I: The cargo ship was sunk in the Atlantic Ocean 30 nautical miles (56 km) north of Ouessant, Finistère, France (48°58′N 5°21′W) by SM UC-21 (Imperial German Navy). Her crew survived.
Eggesford	United Kingdom	World War I: The cargo ship was sunk by enemy action. Her crew were rescued.
Egholm	Denmark	World War I: The cargo ship was sunk in the Atlantic Ocean 8 nautical miles (15 km) north north west of Pendeen Head, Cornwall (50°16′N 5°48′W) by SM UB-18 (Imperial German Navy). Her crew survived.
E.L.G.	United Kingdom	World War I: The fishing smack was sunk in the Atlantic Ocean 25 nautical miles (46 km) north west of Trevose Head, Cornwall by SM UB-18 (Imperial German Navy). Her crew survived.
HMT Eskburn	Royal Navy	The naval trawler was lost on this date.
Gaete	France	World War I: The schooner was sunk in the Atlantic Ocean 10 nautical miles (19 km) north of the Créac'h Lighthouse, Finistère by SM UB-23 (Imperial German Navy).
Harald	Norway	World War I: The cargo ship was sunk in the Atlantic Ocean off Ouessant (49°10′N 3°40′W) by SM UB-39 (Imperial German Navy). Her crew survived.
Interstate	United States	The barge sank in a heavy gale and high seas in Chesapeake Bay three miles (4.8 km) from Cove Point Light, a total loss.
Marie Marguerite	France	World War I: The sailing vessel was sunk in the Atlantic Ocean off St. Ives, Cornwall by SM UB-18 (Imperial German Navy).
Nagata Maru	Japan	World War I: The cargo ship was scuttled in the Atlantic Ocean 40 nautical miles (74 km) north east of Ouessant by SM UB-39 (Imperial German Navy). Her crew survived.
Njaal	Norway	World War I: The coaster was sunk in the Atlantic Ocean 15 nautical miles (28 km) north west of Pendeen by SM UB-18 (Imperial German Navy). Her crew survived.
Roma	United Kingdom	World War I: The schooner was scuttled in the Tyrrhenian Sea 150 nautical miles (280 km) west south west of Naples, Italy (39°06′N 10°38′E) by SM U-63 (Imperial German Navy). Her crew survived.
Saint Ansbert	France	World War I: The sailing vessel was scuttled in the Atlantic Ocean 20 nautical miles (37 km) west of Trevose Head (50°43′N 5°33′W) by SM UB-18 (Imperial German Navy). Her crew survived.
San Antonio	Italy	World War I: The barque was sunk in the Mediterranean Sea 6 nautical miles (11 km) off Aschia Island (40°36′N 13°50′E) by SM U-32 (Imperial German Navy).
Thérèse	France	World War I: The sailing vessel was sunk in the Atlantic Ocean 32 nautical miles (59 km) north by west of Ouessant by SM UC-21 (Imperial German Navy). Her crew were rescued by Fanion (French Navy).
SM UB-19	Imperial German Navy	World War I: The Type UB II submarine was shelled and sunk in the English Channel (49°56′N 2°45′W) by HMS Penshurst (Royal Navy) with the loss of eight of her 24 crew.

== Unknown date ==
List of shipwrecks: Unknown date 1916
Ship	State	Description
Albin	Sweden	The schooner foundered in the North Sea. Her crew were rescued.
Montana	United States	The canal boat sank in the channel near Westerly, Rhode Island. The boat and cargo were salvaged and sold.
SM U-56	Imperial German Navy	The Type U 51 submarine was lost in the Barents Sea after 3 November with the loss of all hands.
