= German submarine U-49 =

U-49 may refer to one of the following German submarines:

- SM U-49, a Type U 43 submarine launched in 1915 and that served in the First World War until sunk on 11 September 1917
  - During the First World War, Germany also had these submarines with similar names:
    - SM UB-49, a Type UB III submarine launched in 1917 and surrendered 16 January 1919; broken up at Swansea in 1922
    - SM UC-49, a Type UC II submarine launched in 1916 and sunk on 8 August 1918
- German submarine U-49 (1939), a Type VIIB submarine that served in the Second World War until sunk on 15 April 1940
