= SM U-50 =

Coordinates: 55°25′00″N 04°17′00″E

History

German Empire
- Name: U-50
- Ordered: 4 August 1914
- Builder: Kaiserliche Werft Danzig
- Yard number: 28
- Launched: 31 December 1915
- Commissioned: 4 July 1916
- Fate: Sunk probably by a mine off Terschelling on or after 31 August 1917

General characteristics
- Class & type: Type U-43 submarine
- Displacement: 725 t (714 long tons) surfaced; 940 t (930 long tons) submerged
- Length: 65.00 m (213 ft 3 in) (o/a)
- Beam: 6.20 m (20 ft 4 in) (oa); 4.18 m (13 ft 9 in) (pressure hull)
- Height: 9.00 m (29 ft 6 in)
- Draught: 3.74 m (12 ft 3 in)
- Installed power: 2 × 2,000 PS (1,471 kW; 1,973 shp) surfaced; 2 × 1,200 PS (883 kW; 1,184 shp) submerged
- Propulsion: 2 shafts
- Speed: 15.2 knots (28.2 km/h; 17.5 mph) surfaced; 9.7 knots (18.0 km/h; 11.2 mph) submerged
- Range: 11,400 nmi (21,100 km; 13,100 mi) at 8 knots (15 km/h; 9.2 mph) surfaced; 51 nmi (94 km; 59 mi) at 5 knots (9.3 km/h; 5.8 mph) submerged
- Test depth: 50 m (164 ft 1 in)
- Complement: 36
- Armament: 6 × torpedo tubes (four bow, two stern); 8 torpedoes; 2 × 8.8 cm (3.5 in) SK L/30 deck gun

Service record
- Part of: III Flotilla; 4 July 1916 – 31 August 1917
- Commanders: Kptlt. Gerhard Berger; 4 July 1916 - 31 August 1917
- Operations: 5 patrols
- Victories: 27 merchant ships sunk (92,924 GRT)

SM U-50 (Note: "SM" stands for "Seiner Majestät" (English: His Majesty's) and combined with the U for Unterseeboot would be translated as His Majesty's Submarine.) was one of 329 submarines in the Imperial German Navy in World War I. She took part in the First Battle of the Atlantic.

U-50 is most notable for sinking the Laconia, formerly an armed merchant cruiser which had returned to passenger service, killing two Americans before the United States had entered the war. Laconia was also the 15th largest ship destroyed by submarine in the war.

== Summary of raiding history ==
Date	Name	Nationality	Tonnage (Note: Tonnages are in gross register tons)	Fate
10 November 1916	Bogota	United Kingdom	4,577	Sunk
11 November 1916	Løkken	Norway	1,954	Sunk
11 November 1916	Morazan	United Kingdom	3,486	Sunk
11 November 1916	Sarah Radcliffe	United Kingdom	3,333	Sunk
12 November 1916	San Giovanni	Kingdom of Italy	1,315	Sunk
12 November 1916	Stylinai Bebis	Greece	3,603	Sunk
12 November 1916	Ioannis	Greece	3,828	Sunk
13 November 1916	Lela	Kingdom of Italy	2,987	Sunk
14 November 1916	Hatsuse	United Kingdom	282	Sunk
18 February 1917	Jean Pierre	France	449	Sunk
22 February 1917	Blenheim	Norway	1,144	Sunk
24 February 1917	Falcon	United Kingdom	2,244	Sunk
25 February 1917	Aries	United Kingdom	3,071	Sunk
25 February 1917	Huntsman	United Kingdom	7,460	Sunk
25 February 1917	Laconia	United Kingdom	18,099	Sunk
11 April 1917	Sarvsfos	Norway	1,462	Sunk
19 April 1917	Avocet	United Kingdom	1,219	Sunk
20 April 1917	Emma	United Kingdom	2,520	Sunk
21 April 1917	Diadem	United Kingdom	4,307	Sunk
23 April 1917	Dykland	United Kingdom	4,291	Sunk
23 April 1917	Oswald	United Kingdom	5,185	Sunk
25 April 1917	Swanmore	United Kingdom	6,373	Sunk
7 June 1917	Yuba	Norway	1,458	Sunk
11 June 1917	Sigrun	Norway	2,538	Sunk
16 June 1917	Carrie Hervey	United Kingdom	111	Sunk
21 June 1917	Ortona	United Kingdom	5,524	Sunk
26 June 1917	Vonin	Denmark	104	Sunk

== Bibliography ==
- Gröner, Erich; Jung, Dieter; Maass, Martin (1991). U-boats and Mine Warfare Vessels. German Warships 1815–1945. Vol. 2. Translated by Thomas, Keith; Magowan, Rachel. London: Conway Maritime Press. ISBN 0-85177-593-4.
- Rössler, Eberhard (1981). The U-boat : the evolution and technical history of German submarines. London: Cassell. ISBN 0304361208.
