= SS Ajax (1904) =

History
- Name: (Norway) Spir (1904–1912); (Norway) Bøilefos (1912–1915); (Norway) Ajax (1915–1917)
- Owner: Thorvik, Nils M. - Bris A/S D/S
- Port of registry: Sandefjord, Norway
- Builder: Framnæs Mekaniske Værksted - FMV - (Framnæs) A/S
- Yard number: 50
- Completed: August 1904
- Fate: Sunk 22 February 1917

General characteristics
- Type: Cargo ship
- Tonnage: 1,468 GRT
- Length: 70.7 metres (231 ft 11 in)
- Beam: 10.7 metres (35 ft 1 in)
- Depth: 6.2 metres (20 ft 4 in)
- Installed power: Triple expansion steam engine
- Propulsion: Screw propeller
- Speed: 10 Knots

SS Ajax was a Norwegian cargo ship that was destroyed with explosive charges by SM UC-17 in the English Channel 30 nautical miles (56 km) north of Ouessant, Finistère, France, while she was travelling from Rufisque, Senegal to Liverpool, United Kingdom.

== Construction ==
Ajax was constructed in 1904 with yard no. 50 at the Framnæs Mekaniske Værksted - FMV - (Framnæs) A/S shipyard in Sandefjord, Norway. She was completed in August 1904 under the name Spir but was renamed Bøilefos in 1912 and Ajax in 1915.

The ship was 70.6 metres (231 ft 8 in) long, with a beam of 10.7 metres (35 ft 1 in). She had a depth of 6.2 metres (20 ft 4 in). The ship was assessed at 1,468 GRT. She had a triple expansion steam engine driving a single screw propeller. The engine was rated at 128 nhp.

== Sinking ==
On 22 February 1917, Ajax was on a voyage from Rufisque, Senegal to Liverpool, United Kingdom. She was stopped and destroyed by SM UC-17, 30 nautical miles (56 km) north of Ouessant, Finistère, France. The ship sank with no loss of life. At the time of her sinking Ajax was carrying a cargo of groundnuts. The ship sank to a depth of over 80 metres (260 ft).
