= SM U-47 (Germany) =

History

German Empire
- Name: U-47
- Ordered: 4 August 1914
- Builder: Kaiserliche Werft Danzig
- Yard number: 25
- Launched: 16 August 1915
- Commissioned: 28 February 1916
- Fate: Scuttled on 28 October 1918

General characteristics
- Class & type: Type U-43 submarine
- Displacement: 725 t (714 long tons) surfaced; 940 t (930 long tons) submerged
- Length: 65.00 m (213 ft 3 in) (o/a)
- Beam: 6.20 m (20 ft 4 in) (oa); 4.18 m (13 ft 9 in) (pressure hull)
- Height: 9.00 m (29 ft 6 in)
- Draught: 3.74 m (12 ft 3 in)
- Installed power: 2 × 2,000 PS (1,471 kW; 1,973 shp) surfaced; 2 × 1,200 PS (883 kW; 1,184 shp) submerged
- Propulsion: 2 shafts
- Speed: 15.2 knots (28.2 km/h; 17.5 mph) surfaced; 9.7 knots (18.0 km/h; 11.2 mph) submerged
- Range: 11,400 nmi (21,100 km; 13,100 mi) at 8 knots (15 km/h; 9.2 mph) surfaced; 51 nmi (94 km; 59 mi) at 5 knots (9.3 km/h; 5.8 mph) submerged
- Test depth: 50 m (164 ft 1 in)
- Complement: 36
- Armament: 6 × torpedo tubes (four bow, two stern); 8 torpedoes; 2 × 8.8 cm (3.5 in) SK L/30 deck gun

Service record
- Part of: III Flotilla; 8 May – 27 December 1916; Pola / Mittelmeer Flotilla; 27 December 1916 – 28 October 1918
- Commanders: Kptlt. Heinrich Metzger; 28 February 1916 – 27 August 1917; Kptlt. Johannes Feldkirchner; 28 August – 29 October 1917; Oblt.z.S. Otto Gerke; 30 October 1917 – 10 March 1918; Kptlt. Wilhelm Canaris; 14 January – 14 June 1918; Kptlt. Adolf Franz; 11–31 March 1918; Kptlt. Erich Gerth; 15 June – 11 September 1918; Kptlt. Carl Bünte; 12 September – 28 October 1918
- Operations: 2 patrols
- Victories: 14 merchant ships sunk (23,932 GRT); 2 merchant ships damaged (9,351 GRT); 1 auxiliary warship damaged (149 GRT); 1 merchant ship taken as prize (1,046 GRT)

SM U-47 was a Type U-43 submarine of the Imperial German Navy (Kaiserliche Marine.). She engaged in commerce raiding during the First World War.

== Career ==
U-47 entered service in early 1916, serving initially with the III Flotilla, and from 27 December 1916 with the Pola Flotilla. Her captain between 14 January and 14 June 1918 was Wilhelm Canaris.

She carried out two war patrols and succeeded in sinking 14 ships for a total of 23,932 gross register tons (GRT). In addition to this she damaged three ships for 9,500 GRT and captured another ship as a prize. Engine troubles meant she could not be used from June 1918, and was finally scuttled at Pula on 28 October 1918 during the evacuation.

== Summary of raiding history ==
Date	Name	Nationality	Tonnage (Note: Merchant ship tonnages are in gross register tons. Military vessels are listed by tons displacement.)	Fate
15 August 1916	Presto	Sweden	1,046	Captured as prize
30 August 1916	Wellamo	Finland	1,050	Sunk
16 November 1916	Dolfijn	Netherlands	140	Sunk
16 November 1916	Parnass	Norway	646	Sunk
1 December 1916	Kediri	Netherlands	3,781	Sunk
4 December 1916	Beira	Portugal	463	Attack with no results
4 December 1916	Ibo	Portugal	492	Attack with no results
7 December 1916	Spyros	Greece	3,357	Sunk
13 December 1916	Salamis	Greece	3,638	Sunk
19 December 1916	Sno	Norway	1,823	Sunk
8 May 1917	Madeleine III	French Navy	149	Damaged
11 May 1917	Hindoo	United Kingdom	4,915	Damaged
13 May 1917	L’Indipendente F.	Kingdom of Italy	182	Sunk
15 May 1917	Pancras	United Kingdom	4,436	Damaged
17 May 1917	Eirini	Greece	2,662	Sunk
18 May 1917	Frances M.	United States	1,228	Sunk
22 May 1917	Lapa	Brazil	1,366	Sunk
24 May 1917	Barbara	United States	838	Sunk
25 May 1917	Magnus Manson	United States	1,751	Sunk
3 June 1917	Vulcanus	France	1,470	Sunk

== Bibliography ==
- Gröner, Erich; Jung, Dieter; Maass, Martin (1991). U-boats and Mine Warfare Vessels. German Warships 1815–1945. Vol. 2. Translated by Thomas, Keith; Magowan, Rachel. London: Conway Maritime Press. ISBN 0-85177-593-4.
- Rössler, Eberhard (1981). The U-boat : the evolution and technical history of German submarines. London: Cassell. ISBN 0304361208.
