= RFA Lady Cory-Wright =

Cargo steamship

Coordinates: 49°45′N 05°20′W

History

United Kingdom
- Name: Lady Cory-Wright
- Namesake: either Lady Mima Cory-Wright or Lady Elizabeth Cory-Wright
- Owner: Wm Cory & Son (1906–14); British Admiralty (1914–18)
- Operator: Wm Cory & Son (1906–14); (United Kingdom) Royal Fleet Auxiliary (1914–18)
- Port of registry: (United Kingdom) London
- Builder: SP Austin & Son Ltd
- Yard number: 237
- Launched: 4 August 1906
- Completed: September 1906
- Maiden voyage: 1906
- Fate: torpedoed 26 March 1918

General characteristics
- Type: collier (1906–14); mine carrier (1914–18)
- Tonnage: 2,516 GRT, 1,523 NRT
- Length: 310.0 ft (94.5 m)
- Beam: 44.1 ft (13.4 m)
- Depth: 20.3 ft (6.2 m)
- Decks: 1
- Installed power: 251 NHP
- Propulsion: 3-cylinder triple expansion steam engine, single screw
- Crew: 40

RFA Lady Cory-Wright was a cargo steamship that had been built as a civilian collier in 1906, became a mine carrier in 1914 and was torpedoed and sunk with significant loss of life in 1918.

== History ==
SP Austin & Son Ltd of Sunderland built her in 1906 for William Cory and Son. She was named Lady Cory-Wright after either Lady Mima, wife of Sir Cory Cory-Wright, 1st Baronet or Lady Elizabeth, wife of Sir Arthur Cory-Wright, 2nd Baronet.

In August 1914 the War Department requisitioned Lady Cory-Wright who used her as a mine carrier. On 26 March 1918 she was in the English Channel steaming from Plymouth to Malta laden with a cargo that included 2,762 mines, 370 depth charges, 2,100 torpedo detonators and 1,000 primers B.E. when the German submarine UC-17 torpedoed her about 14 miles off The Lizard. Lady Cory-Wright's Master and all but one of her crew were killed.

After Lady Cory-Wright sank many of her mines were left floating in the area, and her one survivor reportedly was found clinging to a floating mine. In 2009 her wreck still contained many unexploded mines and detonators.
