= SM UC-17 =

German Type UC II minelaying submarine or U-boat

History

German Empire
- Name: UC-17
- Ordered: 29 August 1915
- Builder: Blohm & Voss, Hamburg
- Yard number: 267
- Launched: 29 February 1916
- Commissioned: 21 July 1916
- Fate: Surrendered, 26 November 1918; broken up, 1919–20

General characteristics
- Class & type: Type UC II submarine
- Displacement: 417 t (410 long tons), surfaced; 493 t (485 long tons), submerged
- Length: 49.35 m (161 ft 11 in) o/a; 39.30 m (128 ft 11 in) pressure hull
- Beam: 5.22 m (17 ft 2 in) o/a; 3.65 m (12 ft) pressure hull
- Draught: 3.68 m (12 ft 1 in)
- Propulsion: 2 × propeller shafts; 2 × 6-cylinder, 4-stroke diesel engines, 500 PS (370 kW; 490 bhp); 2 × electric motors, 460 PS (340 kW; 450 shp)
- Speed: 11.6 knots (21.5 km/h; 13.3 mph), surfaced; 7.0 knots (13.0 km/h; 8.1 mph), submerged
- Range: 9,430 nautical miles (17,460 km; 10,850 mi) at 7 knots (13 km/h; 8.1 mph), surfaced; 55 nautical miles (102 km; 63 mi) at 4 knots (7.4 km/h; 4.6 mph), submerged
- Test depth: 50 m (160 ft)
- Complement: 26
- Armament: 6 × 100 cm (39.4 in) mine tubes; 18 × UC 200 mines; 3 × 50 cm (19.7 in) torpedo tubes (2 bow/external; one stern); 7 × torpedoes; 1 × 8.8 cm (3.5 in) Uk L/30 deck gun
- Notes: 35-second diving time

Service record
- Part of: Flandern Flotilla; 2 October 1916 – 19 October 1918; I Flotilla; 19 October – 11 November 1918
- Commanders: Oblt.z.S. Ralph Wenninger; 23 July 1916 – 21 May 1917; Oblt.z.S. Werner Fürbinger; 22 May – 3 August 1917; Oblt.z.S. Ulrich Pilzecker; 4 August 1917 – 15 January 1918; Oblt.z.S. Erich Stephan; 16 January – 4 May 1918; Oblt.z.S. Freiherr Nikolaus von Lyncker; 5 May – 11 November 1918
- Operations: 21 patrols
- Victories: 89 merchant ships sunk (142,849 GRT); 7 auxiliary warships sunk (1,574 GRT); 8 merchant ships damaged (27,540 GRT); 1 auxiliary warships damaged (315 GRT)

SM UC-17 was a German Type UC II minelaying submarine or U-boat in the Imperial German Navy in World War I. She was ordered on 29 August 1915 and launched on 29 February 1916. She was commissioned into the Imperial German Navy on 21 July 1916 as SM UC-17. (Note: "SM" stands for Seiner Majestäts (English: His Majesty's) and combined with the U for Unterseeboot translates as "His Majesty's Submarine".)

In 21 patrols UC-17 was credited with sinking 96 ships by either torpedo or laying mines. They included the Royal Fleet Auxiliary munitions ship RFA Lady Cory-Wright, which she torpedoed and sank in the English Channel on 26 March 1918.

== Design ==
Like all pre-UC-25 Type UC II submarines, UC-17 had a displacement of 417 tonnes (410 long tons) when at the surface and 493 tonnes (485 long tons) while submerged. She had a total length of 49.35 m (161 ft 11 in) overall, a beam of 5.22 m (17 ft 2 in), and a draught of 3.65 m (12 ft 0 in). The submarine was powered by two six-cylinder four-stroke diesel engines each producing 250 metric horsepower (180 kW; 250 shp) (a total of 500 metric horsepower (370 kW; 490 shp)), two electric motors producing 460 metric horsepower (340 kW; 450 shp), and two propeller shafts. She had a dive time of 35 seconds and was capable of operating at a depth of 50 metres (160 ft).

The submarine had a maximum surface speed of 11.6 knots (21.5 km/h; 13.3 mph) and a submerged speed of 7 knots (13 km/h; 8.1 mph). When submerged, she could operate for 55 nautical miles (102 km; 63 mi) at 4 knots (7.4 km/h; 4.6 mph); when surfaced, she could travel 9,430 nautical miles (17,460 km; 10,850 mi) at 7 knots (13 km/h; 8.1 mph). UC-17 was fitted with six 100 centimetres (39 in) mine tubes, eighteen UC 200 mines, three 50 centimetres (20 in) torpedo tubes (one on the stern and two on the bow), seven torpedoes, and one 8.8 cm (3.5 in) Uk L/30 deck gun. Her complement was twenty-six crew members.

== Fate ==
UC-17 was surrendered on 26 November 1918 and broken up at Preston in 1919–20.

== Summary of raiding history ==
| Date | Name | Nationality | Tonnage (Note: Merchant ship tonnages are in gross register tons. Military vessels are listed by tons displacement.) | Fate |
|---|---|---|---|---|
| 6 November 1916 | Fanelly | France | 307 | Sunk |
| 7 November 1916 | Furulund | Norway | 1,817 | Sunk |
| 7 November 1916 | Suffolk Coast | United Kingdom | 780 | Sunk |
| 7 November 1916 | Thuhaug | Norway | 948 | Sunk |
| 10 November 1916 | HMT Benton Castle | Royal Navy | 283 | Sunk |
| 11 November 1916 | Seirstad | Norway | 995 | Sunk |
| 14 November 1916 | Oiz Mendi | Spain | 2,104 | Sunk |
| 14 November 1916 | Alcyon | France | 59 | Sunk |
| 15 November 1916 | La Rochejacquelein | France | 2,199 | Sunk |
| 15 November 1916 | Torridal | Norway | 688 | Sunk |
| 16 November 1916 | Eugenie | France | 66 | Sunk |
| 16 November 1916 | Petit Jean | France | 126 | Sunk |
| 21 November 1916 | Faunus | Sweden | 749 | Sunk |
| 15 December 1916 | Constance Mary | United Kingdom | 177 | Sunk |
| 17 December 1916 | Alerte | France | 176 | Sunk |
| 18 December 1916 | La Vague | France | 167 | Sunk |
| 18 December 1916 | Maria Louis | France | 108 | Sunk |
| 18 December 1916 | Quo Vadis | France | 110 | Sunk |
| 20 December 1916 | Otarie Ii | France | 109 | Sunk |
| 20 December 1916 | Saint Antoine De Padoue | France | 32 | Sunk |
| 21 December 1916 | HMT St. Ives | Royal Navy | 325 | Sunk |
| 24 December 1916 | Bargany | United Kingdom | 872 | Sunk |
| 25 December 1916 | Courlis | France | 181 | Sunk |
| 28 December 1916 | Pitho | United Kingdom | 150 | Sunk |
| 28 December 1916 | Union | Norway | 563 | Sunk |
| 20 January 1917 | Standard | Denmark | 217 | Sunk |
| 22 January 1917 | Gaulois | France | 76 | Sunk |
| 22 January 1917 | O. A. Brodin | Sweden | 1,798 | Sunk |
| 23 January 1917 | Egypte | Belgium | 2,416 | Sunk |
| 23 January 1917 | Ophelia | France | 159 | Sunk |
| 31 January 1917 | Epsilon | Netherlands | 3,211 | Sunk |
| 16 February 1917 | Hermine | France | 3,940 | Sunk |
| 18 February 1917 | Thorgny | Norway | 734 | Sunk |
| 19 February 1917 | Centurion | United Kingdom | 1,828 | Sunk |
| 19 February 1917 | HMT Picton Castle | Royal Navy | 245 | Sunk |
| 20 February 1917 | Falls of Afton | Norway | 1,965 | Sunk |
| 21 February 1917 | Manningham | Sweden | 1,988 | Sunk |
| 22 February 1917 | Ajax | Norway | 1,468 | Sunk |
| 22 February 1917 | Saint Sauveur | France | 158 | Sunk |
| 23 February 1917 | Belgier | United Kingdom | 4,588 | Sunk |
| 23 February 1917 | Iser | United Kingdom | 2,160 | Sunk |
| 23 February 1917 | Nyland | Norway | 1,824 | Sunk |
| 24 February 1917 | Salamis | Greece | 995 | Sunk |
| 25 February 1917 | Kleber | France | 95 | Sunk |
| 26 February 1917 | Le Lamentin | France | 716 | Sunk |
| 7 March 1917 | Antonio | United Kingdom | 2,652 | Sunk |
| 19 March 1917 | Rhodora | France | 38 | Sunk |
| 21 March 1917 | Huntscape | United Kingdom | 2,933 | Damaged |
| 22 March 1917 | Curlew | United Kingdom | 51 | Sunk |
| 22 March 1917 | Rotorua | United Kingdom | 11,140 | Sunk |
| 23 March 1917 | Maine | United Kingdom | 3,616 | Sunk |
| 23 March 1917 | Mexico | United Kingdom | 5,549 | Damaged |
| 24 March 1917 | Alice | United Kingdom | 61 | Sunk |
| 24 March 1917 | Boy Walter | United Kingdom | 43 | Sunk |
| 24 March 1917 | Endeavour | United Kingdom | 25 | Sunk |
| 24 March 1917 | Enigma | United Kingdom | 24 | Sunk |
| 24 March 1917 | H.C.G. | United Kingdom | 24 | Sunk |
| 24 March 1917 | May Flower | United Kingdom | 38 | Sunk |
| 24 March 1917 | Qui Vive | United Kingdom | 22 | Sunk |
| 24 March 1917 | Reindeer | United Kingdom | 28 | Sunk |
| 24 March 1917 | Satanita | United Kingdom | 30 | Sunk |
| 9 May 1917 | Marchiena | Netherlands | 170 | Sunk |
| 10 May 1917 | Veni | Norway | 654 | Sunk |
| 12 May 1917 | G.L.C. | United Kingdom | 24 | Sunk |
| 12 May 1917 | Galicia | United Kingdom | 5,922 | Sunk |
| 13 May 1917 | Anna | Denmark | 610 | Sunk |
| 13 May 1917 | Hudson | Norway | 817 | Sunk |
| 14 May 1917 | Farley | United Kingdom | 3,692 | Sunk |
| 16 May 1917 | L’hermite | France | 2,189 | Damaged |
| 19 May 1917 | HMT Kumu | Royal Navy | 315 | Damaged |
| 18 June 1917 | HMT Borneo | Royal Navy | 211 | Sunk |
| 19 June 1917 | Kate And Annie | United Kingdom | 96 | Sunk |
| 19 June 1917 | Mary Ann | United Kingdom | 164 | Damaged |
| 21 June 1917 | Childe Harold | United States | 781 | Sunk |
| 21 June 1917 | Scheria | Kingdom of Italy | 2,727 | Sunk |
| 24 June 1917 | Clan Davidson | United Kingdom | 6,486 | Sunk |
| 24 June 1917 | Crown of Arragon | United Kingdom | 4,550 | Sunk |
| 25 June 1917 | Galena | United States | 1,073 | Sunk |
| 25 June 1917 | Saxon Monarch | United Kingdom | 4,828 | Sunk |
| 20 July 1917 | City Of Florence | United Kingdom | 5,399 | Sunk |
| 21 July 1917 | Augustus Welt | United States | 1,221 | Sunk |
| 19 August 1917 | Brema | United Kingdom | 1,537 | Sunk |
| 21 August 1917 | Norhilda | United Kingdom | 1,175 | Sunk |
| 8 September 1917 | Askelad | Norway | 2,823 | Sunk |
| 9 September 1917 | Tuscarora | United Kingdom | 7,106 | Damaged |
| 16 September 1917 | Thomas Krag | Norway | 3,569 | Damaged |
| 2 November 1917 | Cape Finisterre | United Kingdom | 4,380 | Sunk |
| 4 November 1917 | Border Knight | United Kingdom | 3,724 | Sunk |
| 2 December 1917 | Tasmania | Russian Empire | 2,089 | Sunk |
| 4 December 1917 | Forfar | United Kingdom | 3,827 | Sunk |
| 6 December 1917 | Asaba | United Kingdom | 972 | Sunk |
| 7 February 1918 | Creosol | United Kingdom | 1,179 | Sunk |
| 7 February 1918 | Elfi | Norway | 1,120 | Sunk |
| 23 March 1918 | HMD New Dawn | Royal Navy | 93 | Sunk |
| 24 March 1918 | War Knight | United Kingdom | 7,951 | Sunk |
| 26 March 1918 | RFA Lady Cory-Wright | (United Kingdom) Royal Fleet Auxiliary | 2,516 | Sunk |
| 26 April 1918 | Sif | Norway | 3,282 | Damaged |
| 29 April 1918 | Frogner | Norway | 1,476 | Sunk |
| 30 April 1918 | Isleworth | United Kingdom | 2,871 | Sunk |
| 24 May 1918 | HMT Gabir | Royal Navy | 219 | Sunk |
| 24 May 1918 | HMT Yucca | Royal Navy | 198 | Sunk |
| 26 May 1918 | Thames | United Kingdom | 1,327 | Sunk |
| 30 May 1918 | Dungeness | United Kingdom | 2,748 | Damaged |
| 28 June 1918 | Sunniva | United Kingdom | 1,913 | Sunk |
| 8 October 1918 | Thalia | United Kingdom | 1,308 | Sunk |
