= SM UC-26 =

1916 German type UC II minelaying U-boat

Coordinates: 51°3′N 1°40′E

History

German Empire
- Name: UC-26
- Ordered: 29 August 1915
- Builder: AG Vulcan, Hamburg
- Yard number: 65
- Launched: 22 June 1916
- Commissioned: 18 July 1916
- Fate: Sunk, 8 May 1917

General characteristics
- Class & type: Type UC II submarine
- Displacement: 400 t (390 long tons), surfaced; 480 t (470 long tons), submerged
- Length: 49.45 m (162 ft 3 in) o/a; 39.30 m (128 ft 11 in) pressure hull
- Beam: 5.22 m (17 ft 2 in) o/a; 3.65 m (12 ft 0 in) pressure hull
- Draught: 3.68 m (12 ft 1 in)
- Propulsion: 2 × propeller shafts; 2 × 6-cylinder, 4-stroke diesel engines, 500 PS (370 kW; 490 bhp); 2 × electric motors, 460 PS (340 kW; 450 shp)
- Speed: 11.6 knots (21.5 km/h; 13.3 mph), surfaced; 6.6 knots (12.2 km/h; 7.6 mph), submerged
- Range: 9,260 nmi (17,150 km; 10,660 mi) at 7 knots (13 km/h; 8.1 mph), surfaced; 53 nmi (98 km; 61 mi) at 4 knots (7.4 km/h; 4.6 mph), surfaced
- Test depth: 50 m (160 ft)
- Complement: 26
- Armament: 6 × 100 cm (39.4 in) mine tubes; 18 × UC 200 mines; 3 × 50 cm (19.7 in) torpedo tubes (2 bow/external; one stern); 7 × torpedoes; 1 × 8.8 cm (3.5 in) Uk L/30 deck gun
- Notes: 48-second diving time

Service record
- Part of: Flandern Flotilla; 12 September 1916 – 8 May 1917
- Commanders: Oblt.z.S. Matthias Graf von Schmettow; 18 July 1916 – 8 May 1917
- Operations: 9 patrols
- Victories: 29 merchant ships sunk (44,859 GRT); 3 warships sunk (1267 tons); 7 auxiliary warships sunk (15,354 GRT); 5 merchant ships damaged (17,784 GRT)

SM UC-26 was a German Type UC II minelaying submarine or U-boat in the German Imperial Navy (German: Kaiserliche Marine) during World War I. The U-boat was ordered on 29 August 1915 and was launched on 22 June 1916. She was commissioned into the German Imperial Navy on 18 July 1916 as SM UC-26. (Note: "SM" stands for "Seiner Majestät" (English: His Majesty's) and combined with the U for Unterseeboot would be translated as His Majesty's Submarine.) In nine patrols UC-26 was credited with sinking 39 ships, either by torpedo or by mines laid. On 16 February 1917, SM UC-26 was rammed by the Royal Naval vessel Mona's Queen (with over 1,000 troops embarked) near Le Harve. The submarine was hit by the port paddlebox of the Mona's Queen, with her steel paddle floats severely damaging the submarine's bow. UC-26 was ultimately rammed and sunk by HMS Milne off Calais on 8 May 1917.

== Design ==
A Type UC II submarine, UC-26 had a displacement of 400 tonnes (390 long tons) when at the surface and 480 tonnes (470 long tons) while submerged. She had a length overall of 49.45 m (162 ft 3 in), a beam of 5.22 m (17 ft 2 in), and a draught of 3.65 m (12 ft). The submarine was powered by two six-cylinder four-stroke diesel engines each producing 250 metric horsepower (180 kW; 250 shp) (a total of 500 metric horsepower (370 kW; 490 shp)), two electric motors producing 460 metric horsepower (340 kW; 450 shp), and two propeller shafts. She had a dive time of 48 seconds and was capable of operating at a depth of 50 metres (160 ft).

The submarine had a maximum surface speed of 11.6 knots (21.5 km/h; 13.3 mph) and a submerged speed of 6.6 knots (12.2 km/h; 7.6 mph). When submerged, she could operate for 53 nautical miles (98 km; 61 mi) at 4 knots (7.4 km/h; 4.6 mph); when surfaced, she could travel 9,260 nautical miles (17,150 km; 10,660 mi) at 7 knots (13 km/h; 8.1 mph). UC-26 was fitted with six 100 centimetres (39 in) mine tubes, eighteen UC 200 mines, three 50 centimetres (20 in) torpedo tubes (one on the stern and two on the bow), seven torpedoes, and one 8.8 cm (3.5 in) Uk L/30 deck gun. Her complement was twenty-six crew members.

== Summary of raiding history ==
Date	Name	Nationality	Tonnage (Note: Merchant ship tonnages are in gross register tons. Military vessels are listed by tons displacement.)	Fate
23 September 1916	Prinsessan Ingeborg	Sweden	3,670	Damaged
30 September 1916	Maywood	United Kingdom	1,188	Sunk
30 September 1916	William George	United Kingdom	151	Sunk
1 October 1916	Vanellus	United Kingdom	1,797	Sunk
1 October 1916	Villebois Mareuil	France	32	Sunk
3 October 1916	Ada	Norway	1,111	Sunk
4 October 1916	Risholm	Norway	2,550	Sunk
5 October 1916	Isle of Hastings	United Kingdom	1,575	Sunk
13 October 1916	Mercator	Finland	2,827	Sunk
27 October 1916	Blanc Nez	French Navy	247	Sunk
28 October 1916	HMHS Galeka	Royal Navy	6,772	Sunk
30 October 1916	Saint Hubert	French Navy	216	Sunk
1 November 1916	Torpilleur 300	French Navy	99	Sunk
15 November 1916	Saint Leonards	United Kingdom	4,574	Damaged
16 November 1916	HMT Anthony Hope	Royal Navy	288	Sunk
16 November 1916	Joachim Brinch Lund	Norway	1,603	Sunk
16 November 1916	San Nicolao	Portugal	2,697	Sunk
17 November 1916	Monmouth	United Kingdom	4,078	Damaged
19 November 1916	Finn	Norway	3,806	Sunk
21 November 1916	Cap Lihou	France	252	Sunk
22 November 1916	Brierton	United Kingdom	3,255	Sunk
22 November 1916	Trym	Norway	1,801	Sunk
23 November 1916	Dansted	Denmark	1,499	Sunk
25 November 1916	Alfred De Courcy	France	164	Sunk
25 November 1916	Malvina	France	112	Sunk
10 December 1916	Strathalbyn	United Kingdom	4,331	Sunk
28 January 1917	Egret	Russia	4,055	Sunk
28 January 1917	Argo	Norway	1,261	Sunk
28 January 1917	Heimland I	Norway	505	Sunk
7 February 1917	Noella	French Navy	277	Sunk
16 February 1917	Mona's Queen	Isle of Man	1,200	Damaged during ramming
10 April 1917	HMS P26	Royal Navy	613	Sunk
10 April 1917	HMHS Salta	Royal Navy	7,284	Sunk
11 April 1917	HMT Amy	Royal Navy	270	Sunk
11 April 1917	Branksome Hall	United Kingdom	4,262	Damaged
11 April 1917	Duchess of Cornwall	United Kingdom	1,706	Sunk
13 April 1917	Gambetta	France	39	Sunk
14 April 1917	Tom	Spain	2,413	Sunk
18 April 1917	Surcouf	France	195	Sunk
19 April 1917	Senator Dantziger	United Kingdom	164	Sunk
2 May 1917	Certo	Norway	1,629	Sunk
2 May 1917	HMS Derwent	Royal Navy	555	Sunk
3 May 1917	Ussa	United Kingdom	2,066	Sunk
8 May 1917	Iris	United Kingdom	75	Sunk
