= SS Balto =

Norwegian steamship

History
- Name: Himera (1902-1914); Balto (1914-1916)
- Operator: William Thomson & Company, Saint John, New Brunswick, Canada (1902-1914); B. Stolt-Nielsen & Sønner A/S, Haugesund, Norway (1914-1916)
- Port of registry: (United Kingdom) Liverpool, England (1902-1907); (Canada) Saint John, New Brunswick (1907-1914); (Norway) Haugesund (1914-1916)
- Builder: Russell & Co., Greenock
- Yard number: 499
- Launched: 11 August 1902
- Completed: 29 August 1902
- Identification: TPMN (1902-1914), British ON 115313; MKJD (1914-1916)
- Fate: Scuttled 9 November 1916

General characteristics
- Type: Cargo ship
- Tonnage: 3,538 GRT
- Length: 339.3 feet (103.4 m)
- Beam: 46.0 feet (14.0 m)
- Depth: 25.8 feet (7.9 m)
- Installed power: One 3-cylinder triple expansion engine 1,800 ihp
- Propulsion: Screw propeller
- Crew: 25

SS Balto was a Norwegian steamship that was seized by the German submarine SM U-49 on 6 November 1916 in the Bay of Biscay, and briefly used as a depot ship. She was then scuttled in the Atlantic Ocean 70 nautical miles (130 km) north east of Cape Villano, Spain, on 9 November.

The 3,538 GRT cargo ship had been built in Greenock, Scotland in 1902 as Himera for Canadian owners and sold to Norwegian interests in 1914.

== Construction ==
Balto was built as Himera by Russell & Co. Ltd. in Greenock, Scotland, United Kingdom, as the last of 16 vessels they had built for Canadian owner, William Thomson & Company of Saint John, New Brunswick for their general cargo trades. She was launched on 11 August 1902 and sailed on 29 August for Saint John after her sea trial. The ship was 339.3 feet (103.4 m) long, had a beam of 46.0 feet (14.0 m) and had a depth of 25.8 feet (7.9 m). She was measured 3,538 gross register tons (GRT) and carried 5,800 tons deadweight (DWT) of cargo. Her propulsion was a screw propeller, powered by a 3-cylinder triple expansion engine of 298 nominal horsepower and 1,800 indicated horsepower (1,300 kW) made by John G. Kincaid & Company of Greenock.

== Merchant service ==
Himera was registered at Liverpool, England, to the Steamship 'Himera' Company Ltd. of Rothesay, New Brunswick, Canada under the management of William Thomson & Company, and allocated Official Number 115313. She sailed from Greenock for Saint John on 29 August 1902, after sea trials, to enter Thomson's general cargo trades. In 1907 the ship was re-registered at the port of Sant John, New Brunswick. In 1914, Himera was sold to the Norwegian company D/S A/S Balto, under the management of B Stolt-Nielsen & Sønner A/S of Haugesund and renamed Balto.

== Sinking ==
Balto was on a voyage from New York and Bilbao, Spain, to Lisbon, Portugal, and Cádiz, Spain, with general cargo. On 6 November 1916 she was stopped by the German submarine U-49 in the Gulf of Biscay and was forced to follow U-49 as a depot ship; Captain Johnsen was taken prisoner aboard the submarine, along with other captured ships' masters. She was put to use when U-49 stopped the American cargo ship Columbian on 8 November 1916, and forced all 109 crew to board Balto before sinking Columbian with explosive charges 50 nautical miles (93 km) north west of Cape Ortegal, Spain.

Balto met the same fate at 8:00 am on 9 November when her crew as well as the 109 prisoners from Columbian were ordered to abandon the ship and instead board the Swedish cargo ship Väring which had been assigned the same role as Balto before her. At 1:00 pm Balto was scuttled in the same manner as Columbian at 43°00′N 9°00′W, 70 nautical miles (130 km) north east of Cape Villano, Spain. The survivors of Balto and Columbian were joined later that evening with the crew of the Norwegian cargo ship Fordalen which had also been scuttled by U-49, 50 nautical miles (93 km) north west of Cape Villano. As the food supplies onboard Väring were dwindling, the captured crews were brought near the coast and released in the ship's boats. They reached A Coruña, Spain, on 14 November 1916.
