= SS Galeka =

Ship

Coordinates: 49°34′N 0°5′E

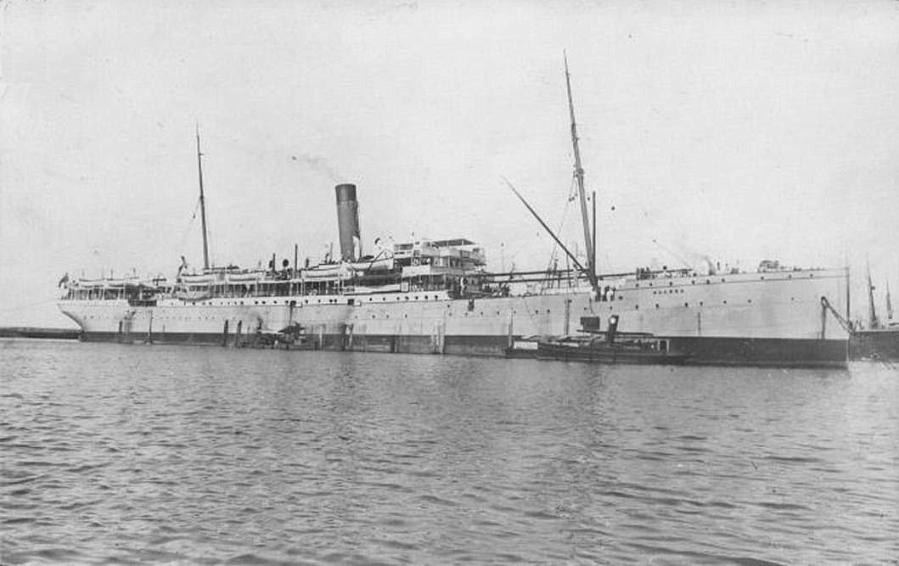
- SS Galeka

History

United Kingdom
- Owner: Union-Castle Mail Steamship Company (1899—1914) Royal Navy (1914—1916)
- Builder: Harland & Wolff, Belfast
- Yard number: 347
- Launched: 21 October 1899
- Completed: 23 December 1899
- Fate: Struck a mine and sank on 28 October 1916.

General characteristics
- Tonnage: 6,767 tons
- Length: 440 ft (130 m)
- Beam: 53 ft (16 m)
- Speed: 12.5 knots (23.2 km/h)

SS Galeka was a steamship built in 1899 for the Union-Castle Mail Steamship Company by Harland & Wolff. She was launched on 21 October 1899 and completed on 23 December 1899. Later she was requisitioned for use as a British troop transport and then a hospital ship during the First World War. On 28 October 1916 she struck a mine laid by the German U-boat UC-26 and sank.

== History ==
The ship was the last vessel to enter service before the merger between the Union and Castle shipping lines in 1900. She served on the South Africa route until the First World War when she was used by the UK as a troop transport, carrying troops of the Australian and New Zealand Army Corps to the Gallipoli Campaign. Galeka was then refitted as a hospital ship with accommodation for 366 wounded passengers. Galeka also served as a vital ''feeder'' to the hospital ship HMHS Britannic during the First World War.

== Sinking ==
Sinking of SS Galeka

On 28 October 1916, while entering Le Havre, HMHS Galeka struck a naval mine. She was not carrying patients at the time, but 19 Royal Army Medical Corps personnel died in the sinking. She was beached at Cap la Hogue, but was a total loss, Union-Castle's first war casualty.

== See also ==
- List of hospital ships sunk in World War I
