= Type U 43 submarine =

German World War I submarine class

Class overview
- Builders: Kaiserliche Werft Danzig
- Operators: Imperial German Navy
- Preceded by: Type U 31
- Succeeded by: Type U 51
- Completed: 8
- Lost: 6

General characteristics
- Displacement: 725 t (714 long tons) surfaced; 940 t (930 long tons) submerged
- Length: 65 m (213 ft 3 in) (o/a)
- Beam: 6.20 m (20 ft 4 in) (oa); 4.18 m (13 ft 9 in) (pressure hull)
- Height: 8.70 m (28 ft 7 in)
- Draught: 3.74 m (12 ft 3 in)
- Installed power: 2 × 2,000 PS (1,471 kW; 1,973 shp) surfaced; 2 × 1,200 PS (883 kW; 1,184 shp) submerged
- Propulsion: 2 shafts
- Speed: 15.2 knots (28.2 km/h; 17.5 mph) surfaced; 9.7 knots (18.0 km/h; 11.2 mph) submerged
- Range: 11,400 nmi (21,100 km; 13,100 mi) at 8 knots (15 km/h; 9.2 mph) surfaced; 51 nmi (94 km; 59 mi) at 5 knots (9.3 km/h; 5.8 mph) submerged
- Complement: 36
- Armament: 6 × torpedo tubes (four bow, two stern); 8 torpedoes; 1 × 8.8 cm (3.5 in) SK L/30 deck gun with 276 rounds

Type U 43 was a class of U-boats built before and during World War I by the Kaiserliche Marine.

== Construction ==
The first two Type U43 U-boats were ordered on 10 July 1913 from the Kaiserliche Werft Danzig ( KWD ). A third boat was ordered on 22 June 1914. When World War I broke out, the German Navy abandoned its scheduled building program and on 7 August 1914 ordered a further five Type U43 U-boats from KWD in its emergency war building ( 'Mobilisation' ) program.

== Design ==
The Type U43 was the continuation of previous double-hull U-boats design but featered a few novelties: these boats were the first U-boats with frames mounted on the exterior of the pressure hull. A further departure of previous U-boat designs was the relocation of the living quarters between the diesel engine compartment and the control room, which as a consequence moved the conning tower above the control room more forward. The boats also lacked the typical step with tank decks, instead the upper deck was incorporated completely in the second, outer hull. Longer periscopes were installed so that periscope depth rose to twelve meter. Type U43s were also the first boats to be equipped with six torpedo tubes. (Note: some sources ( Herzog, Möller & Brack ) mention four torpedo tubes. Rössler expliciitly states these were the first U-boats with six torpedo tubes and shows a Type U 43 diagram with four bow torpedo tubes) Although the longer range G7 torpedo became available the Type U43 were still equipped with G6 torpedoes as no space was available for the longer G7, and as a U-boat was expected to make its attacks on short ranges of less than one kilometer, the range of the G6 was considered adequate enough.

== Characteristics ==
Type U 43s had an overall length of 65 m (213 ft 3 in) The boats' beam was 6.20 m (20 ft 4 in), the draught was 3.74 m (12 ft 3 in), with a total height of 8.7–8.04 m (28 ft 7 in – 26 ft 5 in). The pressure hull had a length of 51 m (167 ft 4 in) and had a diameter of 4.18 m (13 ft 9 in). The boats displaced 725 tonnes (714 long tons) when surfaced and 940 t (930 long tons) when submerged.

Type U 43s were fitted with two MAN six-cylinder four-stroke S6V41/42 diesel engines with a total of 2,000 metric horsepower (1,471 kW; 1,973 bhp) for use on the surface and two AEG double-acting electric motors with a total of 880 kW (1,196 PS; 1,180 shp) for underwater use. These engines powered two shafts, which gave the boats a top surface speed of 15.2 knots (28.2 km/h; 17.5 mph), and 9.7 knots (18.0 km/h; 11.2 mph) when submerged. Cruising range was 11,400 nautical miles (21,100 km; 13,100 mi) at 8 knots (15 km/h; 9.2 mph) on the surface and 51 nautical miles (94 km; 59 mi) at 5 knots (9.3 km/h; 5.8 mph) submerged. Constructional diving depth (Note: Constructional diving depth had a safety factor of 2.5, which meant that crushing depth was 2.5 times construction diving depth.) was 50 m (164 ft 1 in).

The U-boats were armed with six 50 cm (20 in) torpedo tubes, four fitted in the bow and two in the stern, and carried eight torpedoes. All boats received initially one or two 8.8 cm (3.5 in) SK L/30 deck guns. Some boats had their sole deck gun replaced with a 10.5 cm (4.1 in) SK L/45 gun. The boats' complement was four officers and thirty-two enlisted men.

== Ships ==
Name	Launched	Commissioned	Merchant ships sunk (nbr / GRT )	Fate
U-43	26 September 1914	30 April 1915	44 / 116.500	Surrendered on 20 November 1918 and scrapped at Swansea in 1920
U-44	15 October 1914	7 May 1915	21 / 72.332	Lost on 12 August 1917 in the North Sea
U-45	15 April 1915	9 October 1915	24 / 45.622	Lost on 12 September 1917 west of the Shetlands
U-46	18 May 1915	17 December 1915	51 / 139.105	Surrendered on 26 November 1918, transferred to Japanese Navy and scrapped in 1922 in Kure
U-47	16 August 1915	28 February 1916	14 / 21.075	Scuttled on 28 October 1918 off Pola
U-48	3 October 1915	22 April 1916	34 / 103.552	Lost on 24 November 1917 in the Thames estuary
U-49	26 November 1915	31 May 1916	38 / 86.443	Lost on 11 September 1917 in the Irish Sea
U-50	31 December 1915	4 July 1916	26 / 92.764	Missing in September 1917 in the North Sea

== Bibliography ==
- Gröner, Erich; Jung, Dieter; Maass, Martin (1991). German Warships 1815–1945, U-boats and Mine Warfare Vessels. Vol. 2. Translated by Thomas, Keith; Magowan, Rachel. London: Conway Maritime Press. ISBN 0-85177-593-4.
- Herzog, Bodo (1993). Deutsche U-Boote : 1906 - 1966 [German U-boats : 1906 - 1966] (in German). Erlangen: Müller. ISBN 9783860700365.
- Möller, Eberhard; Brack, Werner (2004). The Encyclopedia of U-Boats. London: Chatham. ISBN 1-85367-623-3.
- Rössler, Eberhard (1981). The U-boat: The evolution and technical history of German submarines. London: Cassell & Co. ISBN 0-304-36120-8.
