= Small nucleolar RNA SNORD49 =

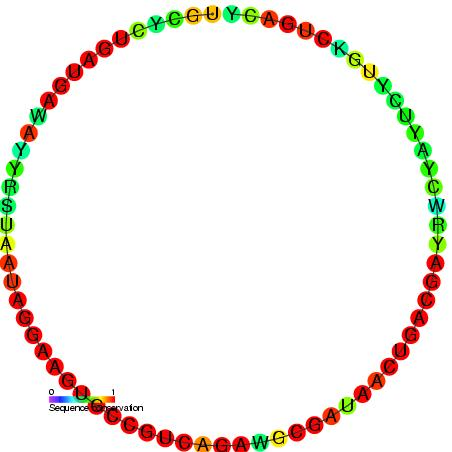
- Predicted secondary structure and sequence conservation of SNORD49

Identifiers
- Symbol: SNORD49
- Alt. Symbols: U49
- Rfam: RF00277

Other data
- RNA type: Gene; snRNA; snoRNA; C/D-box
- Domain: Eukaryota
- GO: GO:0006396 GO:0005730
- SO: SO:0000593
- PDB structures: PDBe

In molecular biology, snoRNA U49 (also known as SNORD49) is a non-coding RNA (ncRNA) molecule which functions in the modification of other small nuclear RNAs (snRNAs). This type of modifying RNA is usually located in the nucleolus of the eukaryotic cell which is a major site of snRNA biogenesis. It is known as a small nucleolar RNA (snoRNA) and also often referred to as a guide RNA.

snoRNA U49 belongs to the C/D box class of snoRNAs which contain the conserved sequence motifs known as the C box (UGAUGA) and the D box (CUGA). Most of the members of the box C/D family function in directing site-specific 2'-O-methylation of substrate RNAs.

U49 was identified by cloning from HeLa cells and is predicted to guide the 2'O-ribose methylation of 28S ribosomal RNA (rRNA) residue C4426. In the human genome there are two related copies of U45 (called U45A and U45B) which are encoded in the introns of the same host gene (MGC40157).
