= SM U-49 =

Type U-43 German submarine

History

German Empire
- Name: U-49
- Ordered: 4 August 1914
- Builder: Kaiserliche Werft Danzig
- Yard number: 27
- Launched: 26 November 1915
- Commissioned: 31 May 1916
- Fate: Sunk, 11 September 1917

General characteristics
- Class & type: Type U-43 submarine
- Displacement: 725 t (714 long tons) surfaced; 940 t (930 long tons) submerged
- Length: 65.00 m (213 ft 3 in) (o/a)
- Beam: 6.20 m (20 ft 4 in) (oa); 4.18 m (13 ft 9 in) (pressure hull)
- Height: 9.00 m (29 ft 6 in)
- Draught: 3.74 m (12 ft 3 in)
- Installed power: 2 × 2,000 PS (1,471 kW; 1,973 shp) surfaced; 2 × 1,200 PS (883 kW; 1,184 shp) submerged
- Propulsion: 2 shafts
- Speed: 15.2 knots (28.2 km/h; 17.5 mph) surfaced; 9.7 knots (18.0 km/h; 11.2 mph) submerged
- Range: 11,400 nmi (21,100 km; 13,100 mi) at 8 knots (15 km/h; 9.2 mph) surfaced; 51 nmi (94 km; 59 mi) at 5 knots (9.3 km/h; 5.8 mph) submerged
- Test depth: 50 m (164 ft 1 in)
- Complement: 36
- Armament: 6 × torpedo tubes (four bow, two stern); 8 torpedoes; 2 × 8.8 cm (3.5 in) SK L/30 deck gun

Service record
- Part of: III Flotilla; 7 August 1916 – 11 September 1917
- Commanders: Kptlt. Richard Hartmann; 31 May 1916 – 11 September 1917
- Operations: 6 patrols
- Victories: 38 merchant ships sunk (86,320 GRT); 2 merchant ships damaged (2,609 GRT); 1 merchant ship taken as prize (566 GRT)

SM U-49 (Note: "SM" stands for "Seiner Majestät" (English: His Majesty's) and combined with the U for Unterseeboot would be translated as His Majesty's Submarine.) was the seventh U-boat of the U-43 class. She was ordered on 4 August 1914 and was put into the III Flotilla 7 August 1916. In her career she sank 38 ships for a total of 86,320 gross register tons (GRT). None was a naval ship.

Kapitänleutnant Richard Hartmann commanded U-49 throughout her career until she was sunk on 11 September 1917 in action in the Bay of Biscay. While surfaced, U-49 attacked the merchant ship British Transport, which had sailed Brest, France bound for Archangel in Russia, laden with munitions and other explosives. After a gun battle lasting five hours, U-49 fired two torpedoes at British Transport. Both missed, and the merchantman then rammed and sank her at 46°17′N 14°42′W; all hands were lost.

It was the first time in the war that a merchant ship had sunk a U-boat. In February 1918 British Transport's Master, Captain AT Pope, was made a Companion of the Distinguished Service Order, three of her officers were awarded the DSC, seven of her crewmen were awarded the DSM and three were mentioned in dispatches.

== Summary of raiding history ==
| Date | Name | Nationality | Tonnage (Note: Tonnages are in gross register tons) | Fate |
|---|---|---|---|---|
| 28 September 1916 | Benguela | Sweden | 688 | Sunk |
| 28 September 1916 | Emanuel | Norway | 246 | Sunk |
| 29 September 1916 | Haarfagre | Norway | 566 | Captured as prize |
| 29 September 1916 | Nornen | Norway | 215 | Sunk |
| 1 November 1916 | Seatonia | United Kingdom | 3,533 | Sunk |
| 2 November 1916 | Caswell | United Kingdom | 245 | Sunk |
| 2 November 1916 | Harfat Castle | United Kingdom | 274 | Sunk |
| 2 November 1916 | Kyoto | United Kingdom | 282 | Sunk |
| 8 November 1916 | Columbian | United States | 8,580 | Sunk |
| 9 November 1916 | Balto | Norway | 3,538 | Sunk |
| 9 November 1916 | Fordalen | Norway | 2,835 | Sunk |
| 10 November 1916 | Camma | Norway | 794 | Sunk |
| 11 November 1916 | Barbara | Greece | 2,831 | Sunk |
| 11 November 1916 | Ragnar | Denmark | 2,123 | Sunk |
| 12 November 1916 | Lady Carrington | United Kingdom | 3,269 | Sunk |
| 12 November 1916 | Leda | Netherlands | 1,140 | Damaged |
| 12 November 1916 | Therese | Denmark | 1,333 | Sunk |
| 15 November 1916 | La Briantais | France | 255 | Sunk |
| 15 November 1916 | Lorca | United Kingdom | 4,129 | Sunk |
| 19 February 1917 | Sigrid | Russian Empire | 2,194 | Sunk |
| 27 February 1917 | Galgorm Castle | United Kingdom | 1,596 | Sunk |
| 27 February 1917 | Luigino B. | Kingdom of Italy | 1,971 | Sunk |
| 27 February 1917 | Tritonia | United Kingdom | 4,445 | Sunk |
| 3 March 1917 | Newstead | United Kingdom | 2,836 | Sunk |
| 3 March 1917 | Sagamore | United Kingdom | 5,197 | Sunk |
| 5 May 1917 | Snig | Norway | 2,115 | Sunk |
| 8 May 1917 | Petunia | United Kingdom | 1,749 | Sunk |
| 11 May 1917 | Barrister | United Kingdom | 3,679 | Sunk |
| 14 May 1917 | Carnmoney | United Kingdom | 1,299 | Sunk |
| 17 May 1917 | George Pyman | United Kingdom | 3,859 | Sunk |
| 1 July 1917 | Stalheim | Norway | 1,469 | Damaged |
| 3 July 1917 | Cimbria | Denmark | 234 | Sunk |
| 3 July 1917 | Mary Boyes | Denmark | 101 | Sunk |
| 3 July 1917 | Proefneming I | Netherlands | 112 | Sunk |
| 3 July 1917 | Thor | Netherlands | 105 | Sunk |
| 8 July 1917 | Obuasi | United Kingdom | 4,416 | Sunk |
| 10 July 1917 | King David | United Kingdom | 3,680 | Sunk |
| 12 July 1917 | Muirfield | United Kingdom | 3,086 | Sunk |
| 15 July 1917 | Dudhope | United Kingdom | 2,086 | Sunk |
| 16 July 1917 | Lamia L. | Kingdom of Italy | 2,220 | Sunk |
| 11 September 1917 | Vienna | United Kingdom | 4,170 | Sunk |

== Bibliography ==
- Burrell, David (1992). Furness Withy 1891–1991. Kendal: World Ship Society. pp. 73–74. ISBN 0-905617-70-3.
- Gröner, Erich; Jung, Dieter; Maass, Martin (1991). U-boats and Mine Warfare Vessels. German Warships 1815–1945. Vol. 2. Translated by Thomas, Keith; Magowan, Rachel. London: Conway Maritime Press. ISBN 0-85177-593-4.
- Haws, Duncan (2000). Manchester Liners, Houlders, Prince and Rio Cape Lines. Merchant Fleets in Profile. Vol. 38. TCL Publications. ISBN 978-0946378395.
- Rössler, Eberhard (1981). The U-boat : the evolution and technical history of German submarines. London: Cassell. ISBN 0304361208.
- Stevens, Edward F (1950). One hundred years of Houlders. London: Mendip Press for Houlder Brothers.
