= SM UC-18 =

Type UC II U-boat

History

German Empire
- Name: UC-18
- Ordered: 29 August 1915
- Builder: Blohm & Voss, Hamburg
- Yard number: 268
- Launched: 4 March 1916
- Commissioned: 15 August 1916
- Fate: Sunk, 19 February 1917

General characteristics
- Class & type: Type UC II submarine
- Displacement: 417 t (410 long tons), surfaced; 493 t (485 long tons), submerged
- Length: 49.35 m (161 ft 11 in) o/a; 39.30 m (128 ft 11 in) pressure hull
- Beam: 5.22 m (17 ft 2 in) o/a; 3.65 m (12 ft) pressure hull
- Draught: 3.68 m (12 ft 1 in)
- Propulsion: 2 × propeller shafts; 2 × 6-cylinder, 4-stroke diesel engines, 500 PS (370 kW; 490 bhp); 2 × electric motors, 460 PS (340 kW; 450 shp)
- Speed: 11.6 knots (21.5 km/h; 13.3 mph), surfaced; 7.0 knots (13.0 km/h; 8.1 mph), submerged
- Range: 9,430 nautical miles (17,460 km; 10,850 mi) at 7 knots (13 km/h; 8.1 mph), surfaced; 55 nautical miles (102 km; 63 mi) at 4 knots (7.4 km/h; 4.6 mph), submerged
- Test depth: 50 m (160 ft)
- Complement: 26
- Armament: 6 × 100 cm (39.4 in) mine tubes; 18 × UC 200 mines; 3 × 50 cm (19.7 in) torpedo tubes (2 bow/external; one stern); 7 × torpedoes; 1 × 8.8 cm (3.5 in) Uk L/30 deck gun
- Notes: 35-second diving time

Service record
- Part of: Flandern Flotilla; 19 October 1916 – 19 February 1917
- Commanders: Oblt.z.S. Wilhelm Kiel; 15 August 1916 – 19 February 1917
- Operations: 6 patrols
- Victories: 30 merchant ships sunk (32,684 GRT); 1 warship sunk (432 tons); 3 auxiliary warships sunk (1,227 GRT); 3 merchant ships damaged (21,157 GRT)

SM UC-18 was a German Type UC II minelaying submarine or U-boat in the German Imperial Navy (German: Kaiserliche Marine) during World War I.

The U-boat was ordered on 29 August 1915 and was launched on 4 March 1916. She was commissioned into the German Imperial Navy on 15 August 1916 as SM UC-18. (Note: "SM" stands for "Seiner Majestät" (English: His Majesty's) and combined with the U for Unterseeboot would be translated as His Majesty's Submarine.) In 6 patrols UC-18 was credited with sinking 34 ships, either by torpedo or by mines laid. UC-18 was sunk by the British Q ship HMS Lady Olive on 19 February 1917.

== Design ==
Like all pre-UC-25 Type UC II submarines, UC-18 had a displacement of 417 tonnes (410 long tons) when at the surface and 493 tonnes (485 long tons) while submerged. She had a length overall of 49.35 m (161 ft 11 in), a beam of 5.22 m (17 ft 2 in), and a draught of 3.65 m (12 ft).

The submarine was powered by two six-cylinder four-stroke diesel engines each producing 250 metric horsepower (180 kW; 250 shp) (a total of 500 metric horsepower (370 kW; 490 shp)), two electric motors producing 460 metric horsepower (340 kW; 450 shp), and two propeller shafts. She had a dive time of 35 seconds and was capable of operating at a depth of 50 metres (160 ft).

The submarine had a maximum surface speed of 11.6 knots (21.5 km/h; 13.3 mph) and a submerged speed of 7 knots (13 km/h; 8.1 mph). When submerged, she could operate for 55 nautical miles (102 km; 63 mi) at 4 knots (7.4 km/h; 4.6 mph); when surfaced, she could travel 9,430 nautical miles (17,460 km; 10,850 mi) at 7 knots (13 km/h; 8.1 mph).

UC-18 was fitted with six 100 centimetres (39 in) mine tubes, eighteen UC 200 mines, three 50 centimetres (20 in) torpedo tubes (one on the stern and two on the bow), seven torpedoes, and one 8.8 cm (3.5 in) Uk L/30 deck gun. Her complement was twenty-six crew members.

== Discovery ==
In March 2024, it was announced that the wreck of UC-18 had been discovered by a team of divers off the island of Guernsey at a depth of 70 m (230 ft), some 64 km (40 mi) further west than the historical accounts of the battle described which was originally believed to have been 13 km (8 mi) west of the coast of Jersey.

== Summary of raiding history ==
Date	Name	Nationality	Tonnage (Note: Merchant ship tonnages are in gross register tons. Military vessels are listed by tons displacement.)	Fate
3 November 1916	HMT Glenprosen	Royal Navy	224	Sunk
5 November 1916	HMT Cantatrice	Royal Navy	302	Sunk
9 November 1916	HMS Fair Maid	Royal Navy	432	Sunk
9 November 1916	Marga	United Kingdom	674	Sunk
10 November 1916	H.m.w.	United Kingdom	93	Sunk
13 November 1916	Lilloise	France	165	Sunk
15 November 1916	Lake Michigan	United Kingdom	9,288	Damaged
16 November 1916	Trevarrack	United Kingdom	4,199	Sunk
11 December 1916	Inger	Denmark	786	Sunk
14 December 1916	Glencoe	United Kingdom	2,560	Sunk
14 December 1916	Leca	Portugal	1,911	Sunk
15 December 1916	Rogn	Norway	1,028	Sunk
17 December 1916	Cascais	Portugal	835	Sunk
17 December 1916	Immaculee Conception	France	246	Sunk
17 December 1916	Prima	Norway	1,233	Sunk
17 December 1916	Prosper Leon	France	42	Sunk
17 December 1916	Saint Yves	France	325	Sunk
18 December 1916	Kansan	United States	7,913	Damaged
22 December 1916	Amedee	France	130	Sunk
22 December 1916	Dansborg	Denmark	2,242	Sunk
22 December 1916	Hroptatyr	Denmark	1,300	Sunk
12 January 1917	Saint Michel	France	419	Sunk
13 January 1917	Toftwood	United Kingdom	3,082	Sunk
14 January 1917	Martin	United Kingdom	1,904	Sunk
15 January 1917	Bernadette	France	128	Sunk
15 January 1917	Otto	Norway	401	Sunk
16 January 1917	City of Tampico	Norway	1,513	Sunk
17 January 1917	Jeune France	France	126	Sunk
17 January 1917	Valle	Spain	2,365	Sunk
18 January 1917	Louis Joseph	France	197	Sunk
18 January 1917	Louise	France	101	Sunk
19 January 1917	Klampenborg	Denmark	1,785	Sunk
19 January 1917	Parahyba	Uruguay	2,606	Sunk
20 January 1917	Phoebe	France	3,956	Damaged
22 January 1917	Aurelie	France	89	Sunk
18 February 1917	Netherton	United Kingdom	199	Sunk
19 February 1917	HMS Lady Olive	Royal Navy	701	Sunk
