= HMHS Salta =

Coordinates: 49°32′8″N 0°2′18″W

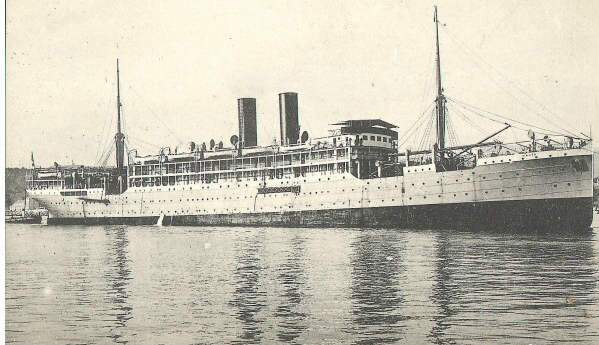
- Salta before her wartime service

History

United Kingdom
- Owner: Société Générale de Transport Maritime Steam
- Operator: Union-Castle Mail Steamship Company (on behalf of the Admiralty)
- Builder: Société des Forges et Chantiers de la Mediterranée, La Seyne-sur-Mer
- Yard number: 1048
- Launched: 13 March 1911
- Completed: July 1911
- In service: 1911
- Fate: Hit a naval mine and sank on 10 April 1917.

General characteristics
- Tonnage: 7,728 tons
- Length: 137 m (449 ft 6 in)
- Beam: 16.2 m (53 ft 2 in)
- Propulsion: Steam, twin screws
- Speed: 15 knots (28 km/h)

HMHS Salta (Note: HMHS is a ship prefix meaning His Majesty's Hospital Ship) was a steamship originally built for Société Générale de Transport Maritime Steam, but requisitioned for use as a British hospital ship during the First World War. On 10 April 1917 she hit a naval mine laid by the German U-boat UC-26 and sank.

== History ==
Built by the French company, Société des Forges et Chantiers de la Mediterranée, at La Seyne-sur-Mer for the Société Générale de Transport Maritime Steam. Salta was chartered by the British Admiralty in February 1915 and converted to a hospital ship. The former liner was painted white with wide green stripes and the insignia of the Red Cross, according to the terms laid down in the Hague Convention of 1894.

== Sinking ==
While returning to pick up wounded at the port of Le Havre, France, Salta struck a naval mine at 11:43, one mile (1.6 km) north of the entrance to the dam. A large explosion smashed the hull near the stern in the engine room and hold number three. Water rushed into the disabled ship which listed to starboard and sank in less than ten minutes. Of the 205 passengers and crew members, nine nurses, 42 member of the Royal Army Medical Corps (RAMC) and 79 crew drowned. The British patrol boat HMS P-26 attempted to come alongside to assist, but also struck a mine and sank.

One of the survivors of the sinking was a steward, Frederick Ralph Richardson. Entered below is a verbatim copy of the report he was required to make once he had been rescued and had somewhat recovered from the ordeal. The report is handwritten. The report contains at least one error in that he describes the Patrol Boat P-26 as a "Destroyer". Any other errors should be listed here so that the report stands as written. Mr. Richardson could not swim and had lost both his parents in a single small boat accident in Brightlingsea Creek, which is on the east coast of Essex near Colchester, United Kingdom.

Report on the sinking of H.M.H.S. "Salta" off Havre. April 10, 1917.

The Salta left Cowes Roads at 4a.m. on the 10th of April for Havre, escorted by one Destroyer. The weather was fair at the time, but the wind increased as we made for the French coast. We arrived off Havre about 11 a.m. and were cruising round to take the pilot on board, when the accident occurred.

I was in my cabin, writing, & the time as near as possible was about 10 mins. to 12, when we struck the mine, near the well deck portside aft. Everyone rushed to the boats, but owing to extremely bad weather and heavy seas, I understand that only three boats got away. These were swamped at once. The only chance now seemed to be to jump overboard at once, & try to float on some wreckage, as the ship was sinking quickly, & was under in seven minutes from the time the mine was struck. I had been in the water less than a minute when Captain Eastaway floated from the bridge as the ship went down and was lost. Miss England, the stewardess, was washed near to me. I spoke to her, urging her to hold on, but she seemed exhausted. I am very sorry to state, that I was quite unable to assist her, owing to such heavy seas running at the time, that it was impossible to do anything. I drifted about on a spar for about 1½ hours and was picked up by a mine-sweeper, & put in the cabin with the other survivors on board. Am sorry to say that several of the men died on this boat from cold & exposure after being rescued, & not from any neglect of the men on board the trawler. Everything possible was done by them for our comfort. We were taken into harbour, at Havre. Whilst making for Havre [this looks to be a subsequent insertion] One of the trawlers [the word "trawlers" is a subsequent insertion] crew reported that a Destroyer had been mined. I discovered afterwards that a good many of the survivors from the Salta were in this Destroyer, & only one of them was afterwards saved. This man was in hospital, & has since been sent to England. We landed at Havre about 3 p.m. I was able to walk at the time, & was taken to the Hospital Huts with the other men, and had dry clothing ( hospital ) issued to us, also Bovril etc., & were made comfortable. During the evening the Chief officer & I were asked to go to the Mortuary to identify our men. I discovered that Young, Lucas, Baker & Taylor from my Dept. were there, and 9 others, the Captain, Engineer, & 7 men of the Deck & Engine Room Dept. We retired for the night at 8 p.m., but I had no sleep owing to such pains, & unable to move. Reported same in the morning to the Doctor, I was taken to the X.Ray room then sent to bed, & found to be suffering from slightly fractured ribs and severe bruises on the body & legs I made enquiries respecting M^{r}. Haley the 2nd. Steward, but none of the survivors saw anything of him. The men were all supplied with suitable clothes by the British Consul. On Monday afternoon, April 16th the funeral of the 13 crew took place with full Naval and Military honours, including the Newfoundland Band, R.A.M.C. officers and men, & a large number of civilians. I was discharged from hospital on April 19th and reported to the British Consul who arranged for me to leave for Southampton on Friday night. Reported myself, on Saturday morning as you know by telephone message. I have given you the most important particulars as far as I know, & trust they are satisfactory.

== See also ==
- List of hospital ships sunk in World War I
