= Glen Art =

Scottish charity for ex-service personnel

- Formation: 2013; 13 years ago
- Founders: Fiona MacDonald
- Type: Charitable organisation
- Registration no.: Scotland: SC043908
- Purpose: Veterans, Dogs, Mental health
- Location: The Old Garden Centre, The Erskine Home, Bishopton, Renfrewshire, PA7 5PU
- Region served: United Kingdom
- Website: www.glenart.co.uk

Glen Art is a Scottish charity helping those from a military background return to civilian life. Their projects and artistic events aim to bring people together and strengthen relationships between ex-service personnel and their communities. Their facility at Erskine provides both dogs and training for veterans and their families.

Glen Art's canine wing Bravehound, was voted the UK's best Voluntary/Charity project in the National Lottery Awards 2017.

== History ==
Glen Art was established in 2013 by Arisaig opera singer Fiona MacDonald. The charities’ objective is to encourage artists and musicians to use their talents in the service of those who have served in the armed forces. MacDonald founded the charity in honour of Mary McKinnon, an Arisaig nurse from Queen Alexandra's Royal Army Nursing Corps, serving on HMHS Glenart Castle 1918.

== Mission ==
Glen Art support ex-service personnel and involve veterans at every stage of each project and work to support them in whatever way they need. They organise artistic and horticultural activities as well as their Bravehound programme, providing training and dogs with the aim to promote healthy exercise, socialising and teamwork.

Glen Art is funded by the Chancellor using Libor funds.

== Activities ==
Events have included Theatre of War in 2015 and 2018, A Poem To Remember launched by Prince William in 2018, a memorial garden in conjunction with the Commonwealth War Graves Commission and the Wilfred Owen Association 2017, a 2016 memorial concert celebrating the life of Sir Nicholas Winton in support of Syrian refugees with the Royal Birmingham Conservatoire and a Night To Remember (2014–2016) featuring Dr Bill Frankland supporting the Parachute Regiment.

Glen Art is a member of the Confederation of Service Charities and regulated by the OSCR (Scottish Charity Regulator).

== See also ==
- Combat Stress
- Erskine
- Help for Heroes
- Hounds for Heroes
- Not Forgotten Association
- The Royal British Legion
- Walking With The Wounded
