= Bravehound =

- Founded: 2016; 10 years ago
- Founder: Fiona MacDonald
- Type: Charitable organisation
- Registration no.: Scotland: SC043908
- Purpose: Veterans, Dogs, Mental health
- Location: Suite 9, Lennoxtown Enterprise Centre, 12 Railway Court, Lennoxtown, G66 7LL
- Region served: United Kingdom
- Patrons: Damien Lewis ~ Jason Isaacs
- Website: www.bravehound.co.uk

Bravehound is a Scottish charity that supports former servicemen, women and their families. They provide training and dogs to support veterans, some of whom have post-traumatic stress, other mental health issues as well as physical injury. Weekly individual and group training sessions are provided free of charge.

Bravehound is funded by the Chancellor using Libor funds, The Covenant Trust Fund and public fundraising initiatives.

== History ==
Bravehound began in 2016 as the canine wing of the Scottish charity Glen Art who support veterans and their families through various events including Theater of War (2015 & 2018),A Night To Remember (2015) featuring Dr Bill Frankland in support of the Parachute Regiment and a 2016 memorial concert celebrating the life of Sir Nicholas Winton in support of Syrian refugees.

== Activities ==
Bravehound's first dog Irma was paired with a veteran of 22 years military service. At the 2017 Animal Hero Awards Irma received the prize for 'Caring Animal Of The Year'.

Bravehound was voted the UK's best Voluntary/Charity project in the National Lottery Awards 2017. Invictus Games medallist JJ Chalmers visited the organisation to deliver the news. Chalmers, a former Royal Marine served in Afghanistan.

In January 2019 Bravehound founder and CEO Fiona MacDonald was chosen by UK Prime Minister Theresa May for a Points of Light Award which recognises "outstanding volunteers who are making a change in their community".

In April 2019 Bravehound won the Soldiering On Award for animal partnership; The Soldiering On Awards recognise the outstanding achievements of those who have served their country, and the diverse people and groups who work together in support of the Armed Forces Community.

In July 2020 Bravehound joined with the Theater of War Project, presenting an online performance with Jason Isaacs, Nyasha Hatendi, Lesley Sharp and David Elliot. Theater of War Productions presents readings of Sophocles' Ajax and Philoctetes for military and civilian communities.

=== Research initiatives ===
Bravehound and Parachute Regiment Robert Hewings, who is also an ex-handler for police dogs, are working on a research project that involves training dogs to recognize the scent of nightmares.

The charity works with Hewings, studying how dogs can be taught to sniff out a nightmare, when veterans may give off a scent of extra cortisol, adrenaline and sweat. The goal is to teach dogs to intervene when veterans are having anxiety attacks, which may be linked to the scent of added cortisol release, leading the dogs to wake them, jump onto their lap or seek attention to calm them down. In an interview, Hewings explained:

When that scent of a nightmare sparks a thought process in the dog, so the scent of the nightmare becomes the antecedent - something that makes the dog do something - the behaviour. The dog gently gets up onto the veteran’s chest and gently licks their neck or does whatever we have trained the dog to do to appease the veteran.

In 2025 Bravehound were ratified as a full member of both Assistance Dogs International and Assistance Dogs UK. Bravehound is the only Scottish member of ADI and the only ADUK member in Scotland, to provide assistance dogs to veterans in who carry invisible wounds related to their military service.

== Patrons ==
- Damien Lewis
- Jason Isaacs

== Awards ==
2017 'Caring Animal Of The Year' at the Animal Hero Awards.
2017 UK's 'Best Voluntary/Charity Project' in the National Lottery Awards.
2019 Points of Light Award
2019 Soldiering On Awards 2019 (Animal Partnership)
2023 Defence Employer Recognition Scheme - Silver Medal
2025 Soldiering On Awards 2025 (Animal Partnership)
2026 Scottish Veterans Awards ~ Veterans Group of the Year
2026 Defence Employer Recognition Scheme - Gold Medal

== See also ==
- Combat Stress
- Erskine
- Help for Heroes
- Hounds for Heroes
- Not Forgotten Association
- The Royal British Legion
- Walking With The Wounded
