= Pollen calendar =

Record of pollen rates over a year

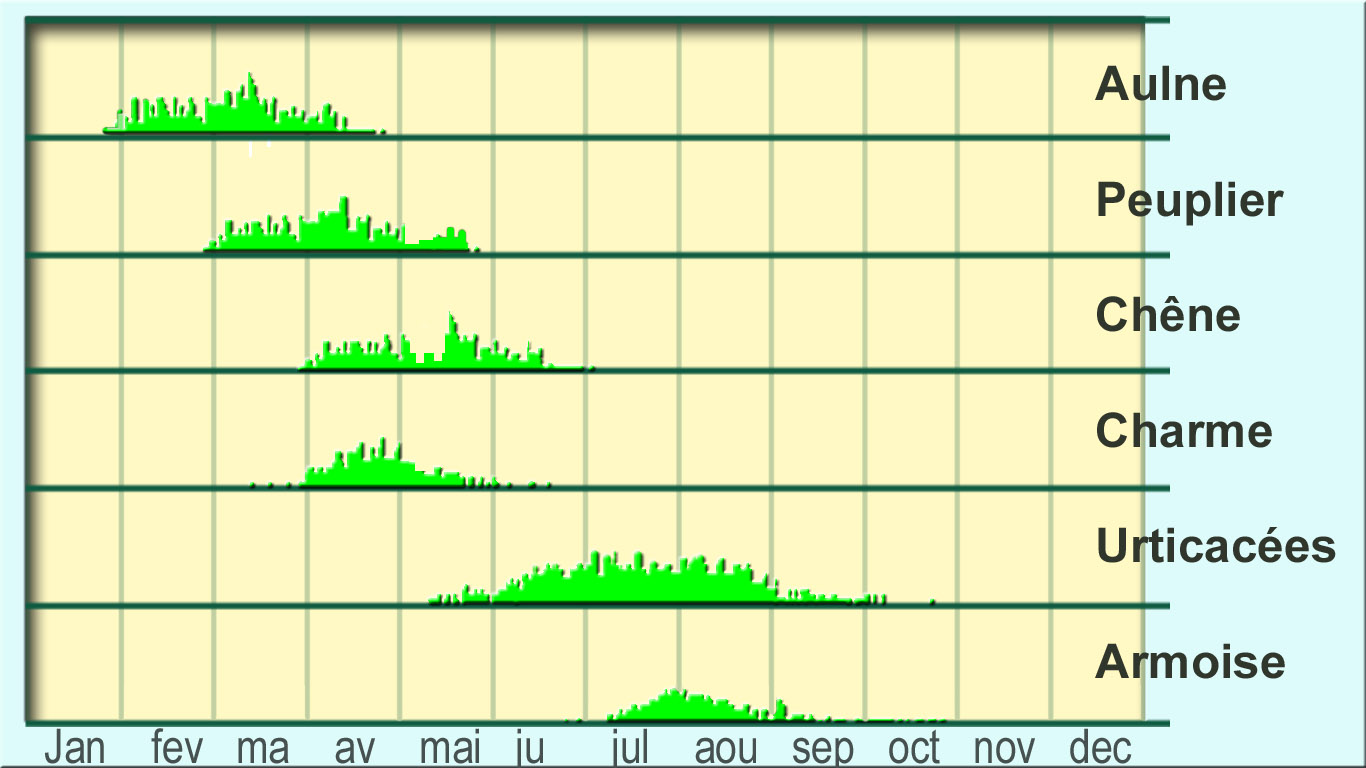
Approximation of a pollen calendar (in French), showing the rise and fall of pollen from different plants over the year

A pollen calendar is used to show the peak pollen times for different types of plant pollen, which causes allergic reactions in certain people.

== In forensics ==
A pollen calendar can be a very useful tool in forensic science, because it can be used to place the month, or week, or date of death. The use of pollen for criminal investigation purposes is called "forensic palynology".

However, the use of a pollen calendar to set the date of death should be used with extreme caution, and only by a carefully trained expert witness. The CSI effect has put pressure on some police officers and district attorneys to provide pollen-based evidence, but such evidence "appear[s] to be of limited use in the forensic context where outcomes are scrutinised in court."

== See also ==
- Aeroallergen
- National Pollen and Aerobiology Research Unit
- Hay fever
