= Peter Marks (journalist) =

American theater critic and journalist

- Born: 1954 or 1955 (age 70–71)
- Education: Yale University (BA)
- Occupations: Theater critic; journalist
- Writing career
- Years active: 1977–present

Peter Marks (born 1954 or 1955) is an American journalist and theater critic. Marks was chief theater critic for The Washington Post from 2002 through 2023.

== Early life ==
Marks is from New York. His father had hoped to become an actor, but was unable to pursue it due to the Great Depression, instead going into advertising. He took Marks and his brother to "a lot of theater," and Marks would perform scenes with his father for the family. His mother was a teacher.

Marks acted in high school and college. He attended Yale University, where he took an acting class with director Nikos Psacharopoulos, but poor grades dissuaded him from pursuing a career as an actor. He wrote for the Yale Daily News and graduated in 1977.

== Career ==
Marks began working at daily newspapers in 1977, starting at the New Brunswick Home News. He also worked at The Star-Ledger and The Bergen Record.

At Newsday, he was part of the team that won the 1992 Pulitzer Prize for Spot News Reporting for coverage of the 1991 Union Square derailment.

Marks was a journalist at The New York Times for more than nine years, covering several beats, including as metro reporter and theater reporter. From 1996 to 1999, he was the "second string" theater critic, covering off-Broadway. He then became a national correspondent, covering media in the 2000 presidential election campaigns. According to Playbill, while a Times critic, "he enjoyed an unusual amount of respect within the theatre community."

In 2002, Marks left the Times to join The Washington Post as chief theater critic. There, he covered theater in New York as well as in the Washington, D.C. region. His writing contributed to raising the profile of Washington area theaters.

Marks co-authored, with Valerie Hendy, American International Group CEO Bob Benmosche's 2016 memoir, Good for the Money.

He was co-host of the podcast Three on the Aisle with critics Terry Teachout and Elisabeth Vincentelli for American Theatre magazine, from 2017 until Teachout's death in early 2022. In April 2022, he and Vincentelli started a new podcast called Marks & Vincentelli.

In 2023, Marks took a buyout offered by the Post and left the newspaper at the end of that year.

Marks has named Walter Kerr, Pauline Kael, Frank Rich, and his Times colleague, Ben Brantley as critics who influenced him.

He has served on the jury of the Pulitzer Prize for Drama several times, chairing it in 2008, 2013, and 2016.

Marks was honored with the 2024 Helen Hayes Tribute Award.

Since leaving the Post, Marks has performed in play readings with Theater of War.

== Personal life ==
Marks lives in New York City. He married Valerie Hendy in 1982.
