= Pollen count =

Method for quantifying airborne pollen

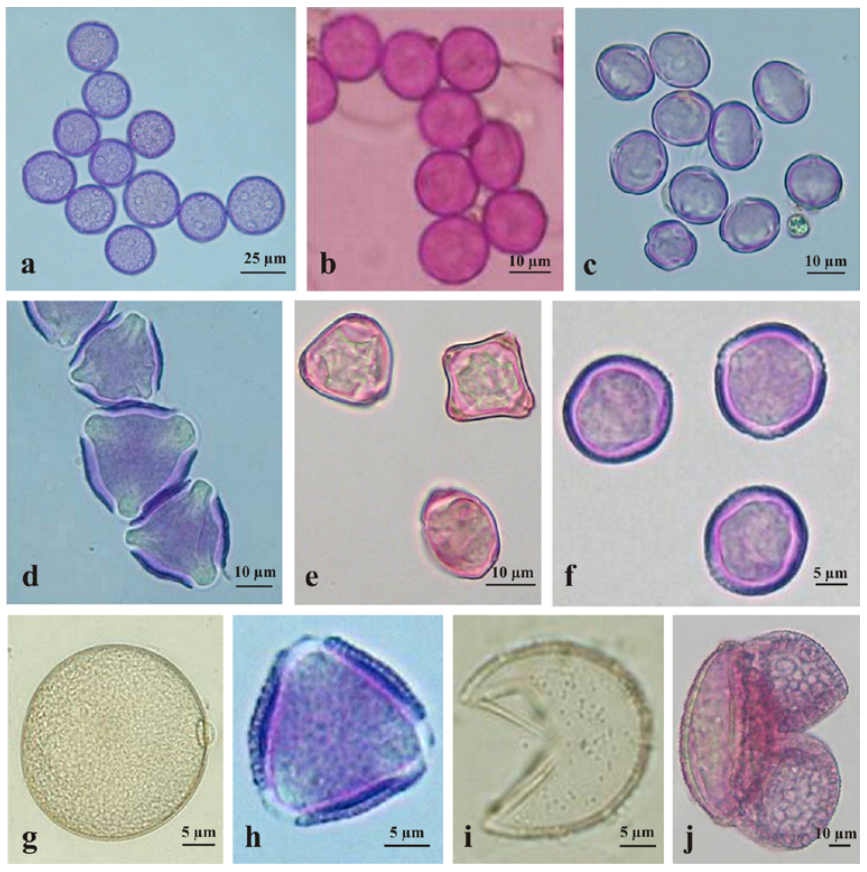
Bright-field microscopy images of pollen grains from a variety of plants. Magenta-colored specimens have been stained with fuchsine.

A pollen count is a measurement of the number of pollen grains in a given volume of air. Pollen counts, and forecasts of pollen conditions, are routinely produced and reported to the public because high aerial pollen concentration is associated with increased rates of allergic reaction for those with conditions such as hay fever and asthma. The pollen counted is usually identified to family; particularly those with hyperallergenic pollen (e.g. grasses, family Poaceae) and families that are prevalent in the relevant area. Thunderstorm asthma events as well as mild winters with warmer days lead to increases in pollen counts, while colder winters lead to delayed pollen release. Though not pollen, hyperallergenic fungal spores such as those of Alternaria may be counted as well.

== History ==
In the UK, the public announcement of the pollen count was popularised by Dr. William Frankland, an immunologist. The National Pollen and Aerobiology Research Unit became the world's first pollen forecasting service in 1983. According to a study by Leonard Bielory, M.D. that was presented to the American College of Allergy, Asthma & Immunology in 2012, climate change is expected to cause pollen counts to more than double by 2040.

== Methods ==
One method for sampling pollen from the air is the Burkard trap, also known as the seven-day volumetric spore trap, which works by facing towards the wind and drawing in air using a pump. The pollen particles drawn in by the pump are then stuck to a silicone grease-coated tape that is attached to a rotating drum. The drum slowly rotates one turn over the course of seven days while collecting particles. The tape is removed after one week, cut into day-length sections, and these sections are mounted on a microscope slide with fuchsine-stained gelatine. The fuchsine selectively stains plant material magenta, making the pollen easy to differentiate from bycatch when analysed under a light microscope. The tape is typically analyzed in a longitudinal transect to account for circadian differences in pollen prevalence. The number of pollen grains in a given volume of air can then be calculated by entering the pollen counts into a mathematical formula that accounts for the sampling conditions.

An alternative method uses a rotating silicone grease-coated rod, called a rotorod sampler, rather than a Burkard trap.

Machines that use a camera paired with computer software to automatically count and identify pollen samples in the field are being developed and tested. This has the potential to save time, standardise data collection, and provide real-time pollen counts without delay.

Metagenomics may be used to circumvent pollen counting entirely. This method has the advantage of facilitating narrower taxonomic identifications than are typically possible with microscopy, but it is more costly.

== See also ==
- Aerobiology
- Palynology
- European Pollen Database, a freely available database of pollen frequencies in Europe
