= European Pollen Database =

Biological database

The European Pollen Database (EPD) is a freely available database of pollen frequencies, past and present, in the larger European area. The database is hosted by the Institut Méditerranéen d'Ecologie et de la Biodiversité (IMBE).

== See also ==
- Pollen count
