= SM UC-56 =

1916 German type UC II minelaying U-boat

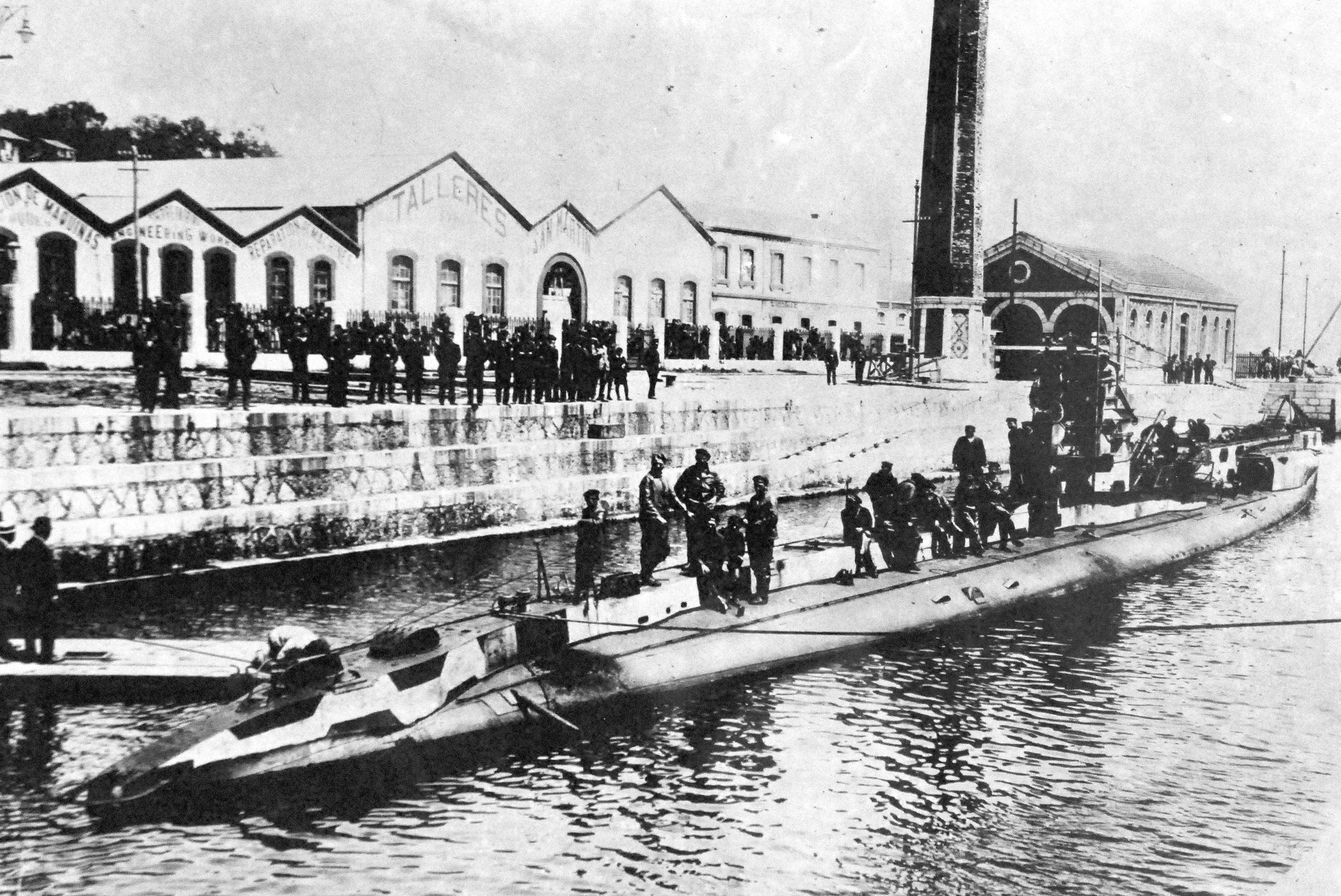
- The damaged UC-56 at Santander, Spain, on 24 May 1918.

History

German Empire
- Name: UC-56
- Ordered: 12 January 1916
- Builder: Kaiserliche Werft, Danzig
- Yard number: 38
- Laid down: 4 March 1916
- Launched: 26 August 1916
- Commissioned: 18 December 1916
- Fate: Interned at Santander, Spain, 24 May 1918

General characteristics
- Class & type: Type UC II submarine
- Displacement: 415 t (408 long tons), surfaced; 498 t (490 long tons), submerged
- Length: 52.69 m (172 ft 10 in) o/a; 40.96 m (134 ft 5 in) pressure hull
- Beam: 5.22 m (17 ft 2 in) o/a; 3.65 m (12 ft) pressure hull
- Draught: 3.61 m (11 ft 10 in)
- Propulsion: 2 × propeller shafts; 2 × 6-cylinder, 4-stroke diesel engines, 580–600 PS (430–440 kW; 570–590 shp); 2 × electric motors, 620 PS (460 kW; 610 shp)
- Speed: 11.6 knots (21.5 km/h; 13.3 mph), surfaced; 7.3 knots (13.5 km/h; 8.4 mph), submerged
- Range: 8,660–9,450 nmi (16,040–17,500 km; 9,970–10,870 mi) at 7 knots (13 km/h; 8.1 mph) surfaced; 52 nmi (96 km; 60 mi) at 4 knots (7.4 km/h; 4.6 mph) submerged
- Test depth: 50 meters (160 ft)
- Complement: 26
- Armament: 6 × 100 cm (39.4 in) mine tubes; 18 × UC 200 mines; 3 × 50 cm (19.7 in) torpedo tubes (2 bow/external; one stern); 7 × torpedoes; 1 × 8.8 cm (3.5 in) Uk L/30 deck gun
- Notes: 30-second diving time

Service record
- Part of: Baltic Flotilla; 20 August – 10 December 1917; Flandern I Flotilla; 10 December 1917 – 24 May 1918
- Commanders: Kptlt. Johannes Remy; 18 December 1916 – 31 January 1917; Kptlt. Wilhelm Kiesewetter; 1 February 1917 – 24 May 1918
- Operations: 6 patrols
- Victories: 1 auxiliary warship sunk (6,824 GRT)

SM UC-56 was a German Type UC II minelaying submarine or U-boat in the German Imperial Navy (German: Kaiserliche Marine) during World War I. The U-boat was ordered on 12 January 1916, laid down on 4 March 1916, and was launched on 26 August 1916. She was commissioned into the German Imperial Navy on 18 December 1916 as SM UC-56. (Note: "SM" stands for "Seiner Majestät" (English: His Majesty's) and combined with the U for Unterseeboot would be translated as His Majesty's Submarine.) In six patrols UC-56 was credited with sinking one ship by torpedo: the British hospital ship HMHS Glenart Castle. UC-56 suffered from mechanical breakdowns that prevented her from submerging. She put in at Santander, Spain, on 24 May 1918 and was interned there for the duration of the war.

== Design ==
A Type UC II submarine, UC-56 had a displacement of 415 tonnes (408 long tons) when at the surface and 498 tonnes (490 long tons) while submerged. She had a length overall of 50.52 m (165 ft 9 in), a beam of 5.22 m (17 ft 2 in), and a draught of 3.61 m (11 ft 10 in). The submarine was powered by two six-cylinder four-stroke diesel engines each producing 290–300 metric horsepower (210–220 kW; 290–300 shp) (a total of 580–600 metric horsepower (430–440 kW; 570–590 shp)), two electric motors producing 620 metric horsepower (460 kW; 610 shp), and two propeller shafts. She had a dive time of 48 seconds and was capable of operating at a depth of 50 metres (160 ft).

The submarine had a maximum surface speed of 11.6 knots (21.5 km/h; 13.3 mph) and a submerged speed of 7.3 knots (13.5 km/h; 8.4 mph). When submerged, she could operate for 52 nautical miles (96 km; 60 mi) at 4 knots (7.4 km/h; 4.6 mph); when surfaced, she could travel 8,660 to 9,450 nautical miles (16,040 to 17,500 km; 9,970 to 10,870 mi) at 7 knots (13 km/h; 8.1 mph). UC-56 was fitted with six 100 centimetres (39 in) mine tubes, eighteen UC 200 mines, three 50 centimetres (20 in) torpedo tubes (one on the stern and two on the bow), seven torpedoes, and one 8.8 cm (3.5 in) Uk L/30 deck gun. Her complement was twenty-six crew members.

== Fate ==
The U-boat was attacked with depth charges dropped by the USS Christabel on 21 May 1918. It was not capable of submerging again due to battle damage. On 24 May 1918, the U-boat arrived at Santander, Spain after a dangerous three-day voyage in a severely damaged condition. The crew of UC-56 were interned, the Germans reported to the Spanish authorities that their submarine had been seriously damaged by Christabel, and that they had had no choice but to take refuge in a neutral port.

== Summary of raiding history ==
Date	Name	Nationality	Tonnage (Note: Merchant ship tonnages are in gross register tons. Military vessels are listed by tons displacement.)	Fate
26 February 1918	HMHS Glenart Castle	Royal Navy	6,824	Sunk

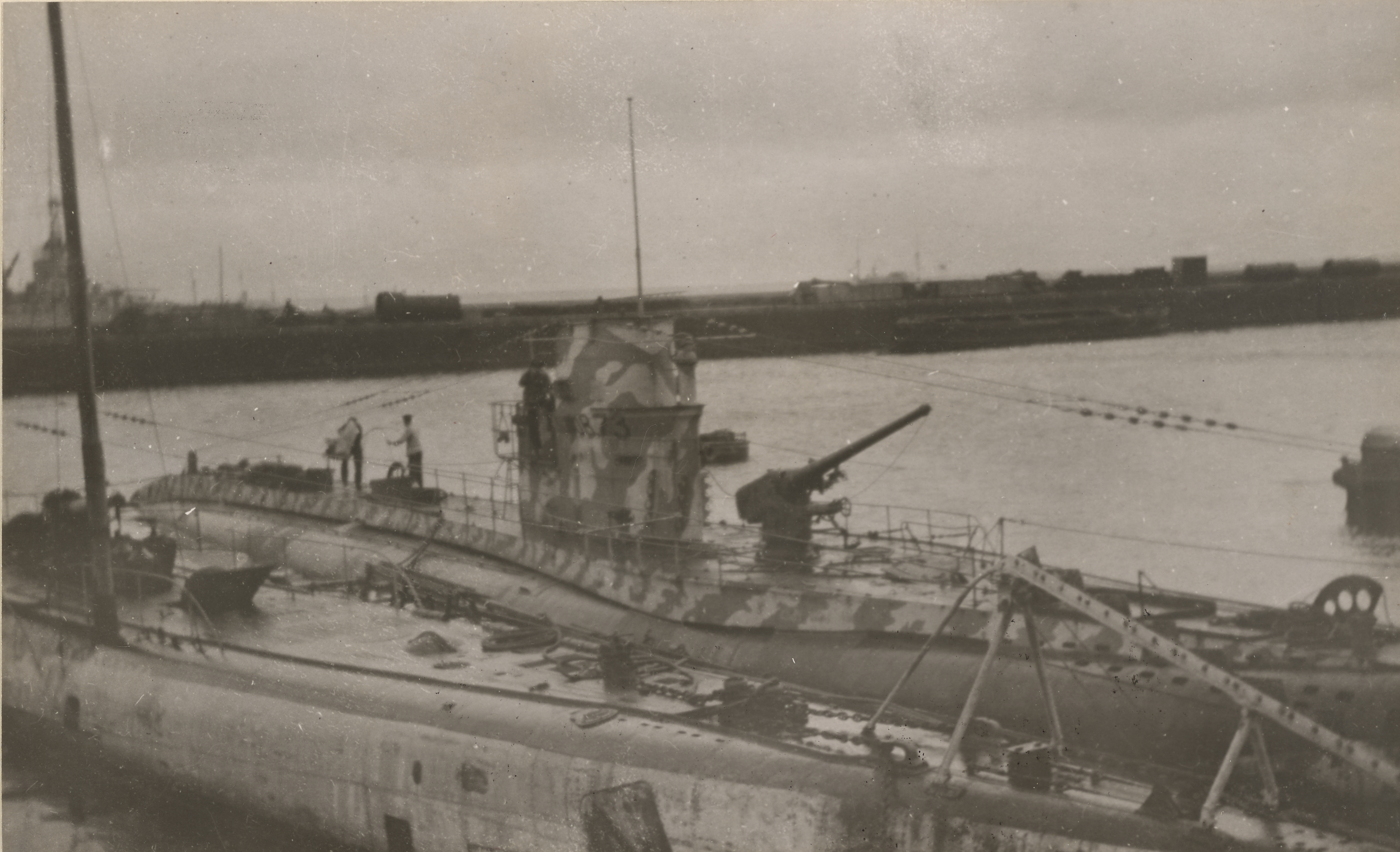
Surrendered U-boats U-108 and UC-56, in Brest docks in 1918, turned over to the French under armistice terms, UC-56 in the foreground.)
