= Anaphylaxis Campaign =

British charity

Anaphylaxis UK is a British charity that solely supports people at risk from serious allergic reactions. For over 30 years, the charity has provided information and support to patients and their families.

Anaphylaxis UK was created to ensure a safe environment for all people with allergies by working with and educating the food industry, schools, pre-schools, colleges, health professionals and other key audiences. It focuses on medical facts, food labelling, risk reduction and allergen management.

The charity also trains patients, carers and healthcare professionals through its AllergyWise online training. It actively campaigns to raise awareness of anaphylaxis with the general public and with the relevant authorities for better allergy care and treatments.

== Origins and key people ==
The Campaign was established in 1994 following the deaths of four people from allergic reactions to nuts. Its founder and honorary president, David Reading, was made OBE in the 2005 New Year's Honours List for services to people with allergies.

The Campaign's former honorary president is William Frankland, the pioneer immunologist, who died in April 2020.

Olympic swimmer Mark Foster has been the Campaign's patron since 2009. His friend and fellow-athlete, Ross Baillie died following an anaphylactic reaction in 1999.

Chef Giorgio Locatelli and global parenting expert Jo Frost are also patrons of the Anaphylaxis Campaign.

In 2020, the Anaphylaxis Campaign appointed Dan Kelly, founder of the 'May Contain' blog (Instagram @_maycontain) and podcast, as youth ambassador. In this role, Dan works with the charity to support and empower young people living with severe allergies.

Professor John Warner, Professor of Paediatrics, Imperial College, London and Hon.Professor University of Cape Town, South Africa, became the Anaphylaxis Campaign's Clinical and Scientific Advisory Panel chair in 2020.

== Making Schools Safer ==
The charity’s Making Schools Safer campaign provides schools with the knowledge and expertise to support severely allergic children. This includes free school resources, presentations and free online e-learning AllergyWise courses.

For two years Anaphylaxis UK – together with Allergy UK, the British Society for Allergy & Clinical Immunology (BSACI), the British Paediatric Allergy Immunity and Infection Group (BPAIIG), and the Royal College of Paediatrics and Child Health (RCPCH) – campaigned for a change in the law to allow schools to hold generic adrenaline auto-injectors, and ensure they have sufficient trained staff to operate the device in case of an emergency.

From 1 October 2017, the Human Medicines (Amendment) Regulations 2017 has allowed schools in the UK to buy adrenaline auto-injector devices (known as AAIs) without a prescription to use in an emergency on children who are at risk of a severe allergic reaction (known as anaphylaxis) but whose own device is not available or not working. This could be because their AAI(s) are broken, or out of date, for example.

== National lobbying to July 2022 ==
The Anaphylaxis Campaign is a founder member of the National Allergy Strategy Group, a coalition of charities, professional organisations and industry, that seeks to improve health services for people with allergies in the UK.

The charity has called for clearer guidelines and greater consistency on food labelling. It has also lobbied to remove what it considers to be unnecessary 'may contain' labelling, arguing that food manufacturers should only use these labels when there is a genuine risk to people with allergies.

The Anaphylaxis Campaign has tried to raise awareness of the problems caused by inconsistency in how severe allergy is diagnosed. To help improve awareness among frontline medical practitioners, it launched an online training programme, called AllergyWise, in 2011, accredited by the Royal College of Nursing.

In March 2011, the charity held a national conference with the Food Standards Agency, the UK government department, on 'Communicating the science of food allergy'.

== See also ==
- Anaphylaxis
- Allergy
