= HMHS Glenart Castle =

1900 liner used as a hospital ship

Coordinates: 51°7′N 5°3′W

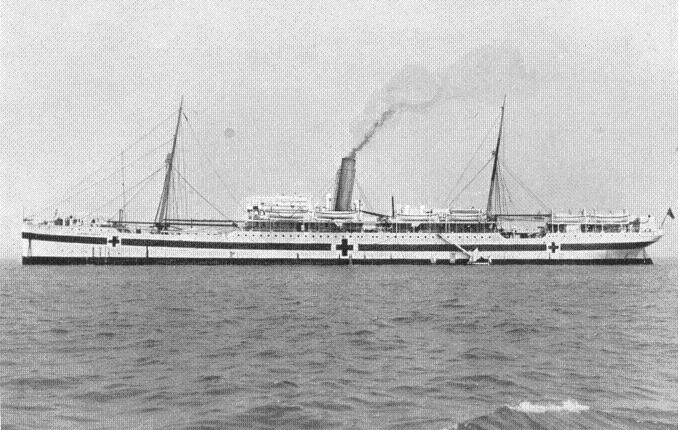
- HMHS Glenart Castle, in her wartime service colours

History

United Kingdom
- Name: Galician
- Owner: UK
- Operator: Union-Castle Line
- Builder: Harland and Wolff, Belfast
- Cost: 50 Bil
- Yard number: 4637
- Way number: 098
- Laid down: 7/6/1900
- Launched: 20 September 1900
- Completed: 6 December 1900
- Identification: 6824
- Fate: Acquired by Royal Navy in 1914

United Kingdom
- Name: Glenart Castle
- Acquired: 1914
- Fate: Torpedoed, 26 February 1918

General characteristics
- Tonnage: 6,807 GRT
- Length: 400 ft (120 m)
- Speed: 12.5 knots (23.2 km/h; 14.4 mph)

HMHS Glenart Castle (His Majesty's Hospital Ship) was a steamship originally built as Galician in 1900 for the Union-Castle Line. She was renamed Glenart Castle in 1914, but was requisitioned for use as a British hospital ship during the First World War. On 26 February 1918, she was hit and sunk by a torpedo fired from the German U-boat UC-56.

== Operational history ==
=== War service ===
Britain entered the First World War on 4 August 1914. The next day Galician was held up west of the Canary Islands by a ship flying a German flag. German officers boarded her, searched her papers and took two Army officer passengers prisoner before releasing her. In October 1914 she was refitted as a hospital ship and renamed Glenart Castle.

=== Mine damage ===
Glenart Castle subsequently suffered damaged when she struck a mine in the English Channel 8 nautical miles (15 km; 9.2 mi) northwest of the Owers Lightship on 1 March 1917. Hit near the rear starboard around 23:40, the engines were stopped and the damage inspected. The watertight doors to the engine room were warped and could not be closed completely. Upon hearing that the boiler room and Number 4 hold were flooding, Captain Day ordered the ship to be evacuated. All 115 crew, 68 medical staff and 525 patients were saved, and the crippled ship was towed into Portsmouth. Glenart Castle was repaired and returned to service in November 1917.

=== Sinking ===
On 25 February 1918, Glenart Castle left Newport, South Wales, heading towards Brest, France, to collect patients. After 3:00 on 26 February, fishermen in the Bristol Channel saw her clearly lit up as a hospital ship. John Hill — a fisherman on Swansea Castle — remembered "I saw the Hospital Ship with green lights all around her – around the saloon. She had her red side lights showing and mast-head light, and also another red light which I suppose was the Red Cross light." A little before 04:00, Glenart Castle was hit by a torpedo fired from the German U-boat UC-56 in the No. 3 hold. The blast destroyed most of the lifeboats, while the subsequent pitch of the vessel hindered attempts to launch the remaining boats. In the seven to eight minutes the ship took to sink, accounts varied as to how many lifeboats were launched, but only one lifeboat carrying 22 men survived the night on rough seas. The men bailed constantly in wintry conditions to avoid being swamped. They were rescued by a French boat, Feon, around 10:30. Four rafts bearing nine more men were located by USS Parker between 13:00 and 15:00. Fireman Jesse White washed astern in his exhausted state and was injured by Parker's propeller. White died on board. One man was unconscious when rescued and died in hospital the next day having never recovered consciousness. He was subsequently identified as Royal Army Medical Corps (RAMC) Private Samuel "Harry" Lund. The body of wireless operator Michael Sinnott was recovered off Trevose Head, Cornwall, on 2 March 1918.

The most likely figures are that 182 were on board, of whom 29 survived. A total of 153 people were killed. Ninety-five of 120 crew died, including Captain Bernard Burt who had given the order "Every Man For Himself" before he was last seen retiring to the chart room. Both chaplains, 48 of 52 RAMC personnel, and all eight nurses of the Queen Alexandra's Imperial Military Nursing Service died. The matron of Glenart Castle, Kate Beaufoy, was among those killed in the sinking. Beaufoy was a veteran of the South African War and the Gallipoli campaign. Her family kept her diary and her writings describe life on the ship. Also killed was Staff Nurse Edith Blake, the only Australian nurse killed in action in the First World War. Having trained at the Coast Hospital (later Prince Henry Hospital) in Sydney, she volunteered to serve and was one of almost 130 Australian nurses allotted to the QAIMNS. She nursed at 1 Australian General Hospital in Cairo and 17 British General Hospital in Alexandria, on HMHS Essequibo and nursed Germans at Belmont Prisoners of War Hospital, Surrey before joining Glenart Castle. She described her war service in detailed letters home to her family.

Newspaper reports suggested that the submarine may have shot at initial survivors of the sinking in an effort to cover up the sinking of Glenart Castle. The body of a junior officer of Glenart Castle was recovered from the water close to the position of the sinking. It was marked with two gunshot wounds, one in the neck and the other in the thigh. The body also had a life vest indicating he was shot while in the water. However, official records do not support this story.

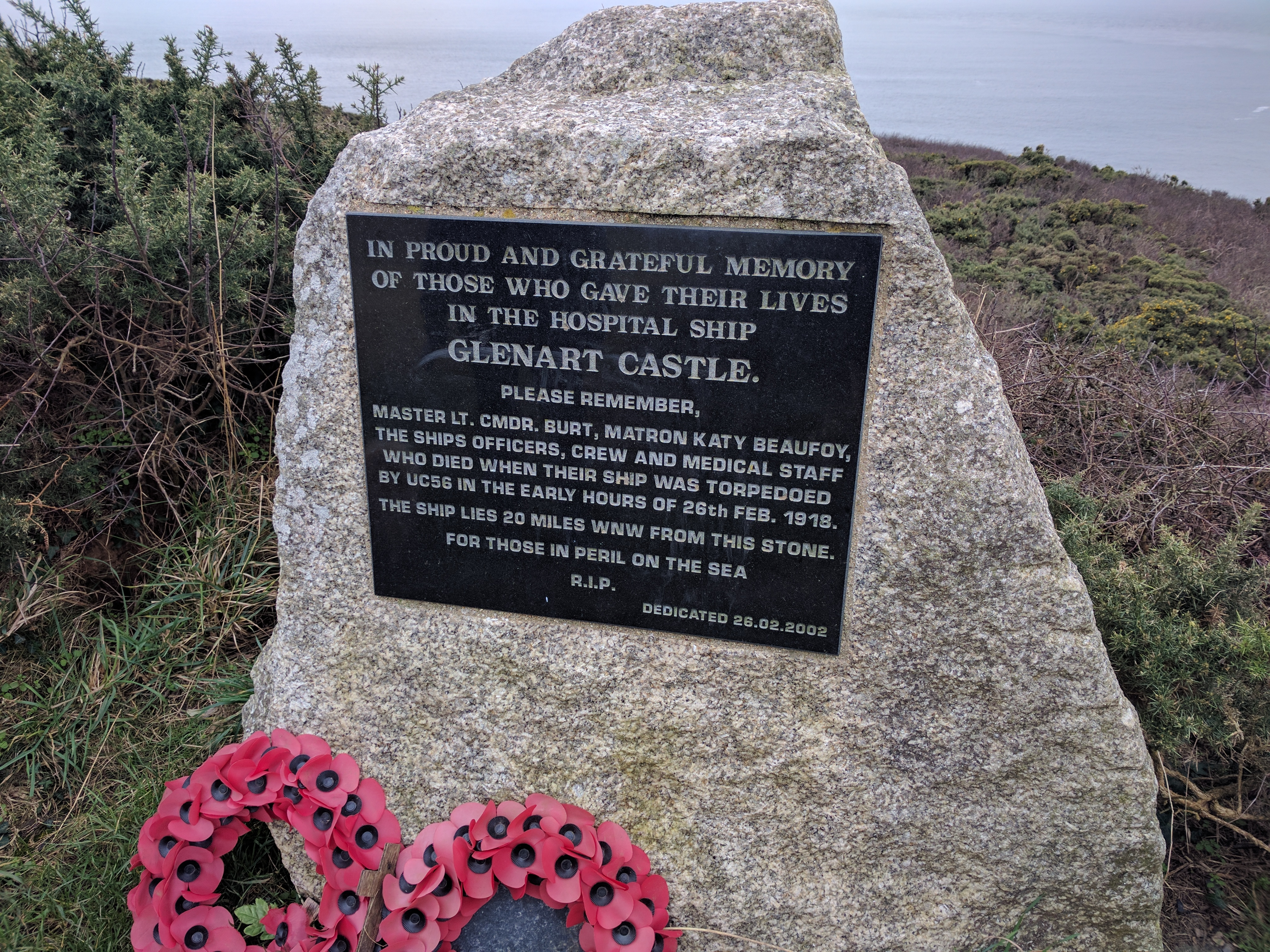
Memorial stone to Glenart Castle

== Aftermath ==
The ship's wreck lies approximately 10 mi (16 km) west of Lundy in 240 ft (73 m) of water at 51°7'N 5°3'W.

After the war, the British Admiralty sought the captains of U-boats who sank hospital ships, in order to charge them with war crimes. Kapitänleutnant Wilhelm Kiesewetter — the commander of UC-56 — was arrested after the war on his voyage back to Germany and interned in the Tower of London. He was released on the grounds that Britain had no right to hold a detainee during the Armistice. Britain pressed for Berlin to pursue the cases concerning the British hospital ships Rewa, Glenart Castle, Guildford Castle and Llandovery Castle at the Leipzig War Crimes Trials, as all were attacked in waters in which Germany had declared that they would be respected under the Hague Convention. Only the case of HMHS Llandovery Castle was prosecuted, but the convictions were quashed.

== Memorial ==
A memorial plaque was dedicated on the 84th anniversary of the sinking, 26 February 2002 near to Hartland Point, with the inscription, "In proud and grateful memory of those who gave their lives in the hospital ship Glenart Castle. Please remember, Master Lt. Cmdr. Burt, Matron Katy Beaufoy, the ships officers, crew and medical staff who died when their ship was torpedoed by UC56 in the early hours of 26th Feb 1918. The ship lies 20 miles WNW from this stone. For those in peril on the sea. R.I.P. Dedicated 26.02.2002".

The Scottish military charity Glen Art was founded in 2013 by Fiona MacDonald in honour of her great-aunt nurse Mary McKinnon who died while serving on the ship. In February 2018, Glen Art held a memorial concert in Arisaig Scotland commemorating the centenary of the sinking of HMHS Glenart Castle and nurse McKinnon's death.

== See also ==
- SS Rohilla
- List of hospital ships sunk in World War I
