= National Pollen and Aerobiology Research Unit =

- NPARU
- Location within Worcestershire
- Former names: National Pollen and Hayfever Bureau, National Pollen Research Unit

General information
- Type: Microbiology Research Centre
- Location: Worcester, WR2 6AJ
- Coordinates: 52.1975°N 2.244°W
- Elevation: 30 m (98 ft)
- Current tenants: NPRU
- Completed: 2009
- Inaugurated: 2 December 2009
- Cost: £7m

Technical details
- Floor count: 2
- Floor area: 15,000 sq m

Design and construction
- Architect: BDP

The National Pollen and Aerobiology Research Unit or NPARU is a research institute in Worcester. It produces the UK's pollen count, and was the world's first pollen forecasting service.

== History ==
Aerobiology is the study of organic particles and organisms in the atmosphere. The National Pollen and Hayfever Bureau was founded in Rotherham on 21 April 1983. Forecasts for Britain's six million people with hay fever (allergic rhinitis) began from 1 June 1983; it was funded by Fisons Pharmaceuticals. Most people with hay fever are aged 15–24 in the months of June and July. Treatments are Beconase (beclometasone dipropionate) and Flixonase (fluticasone propionate). In May 1984 it was about to close when funding by Fisons was withdrawn; the centre continued with funding from kleenex The first amateur pollen trap is now lodged in The National Science Museum The original network was mainly serviced by 30 local authorities on a voluntary basis.

Clarityline, a 24-hour helpline for the pollen count began in April 1994.

It became the National Pollen Research Unit, and moved to Worcester. The new building was officially opened on 2 December 2009 by Prince Richard, Duke of Gloucester.

== Function ==
Its pollen forecasts are produced in collaboration with the Met Office.

== Structure ==
It is housed in the Charles Darwin Building, designed by the Building Design Partnership. It was built in 2009 at a cost of £7m. It is situated in the west of Worcester, off the A443 and north of the Three Choirs Way.

== See also ==
- Asthma UK
- Royal National Throat, Nose and Ear Hospital
