= Thunderstorm asthma =

Biometeorological phenomenon

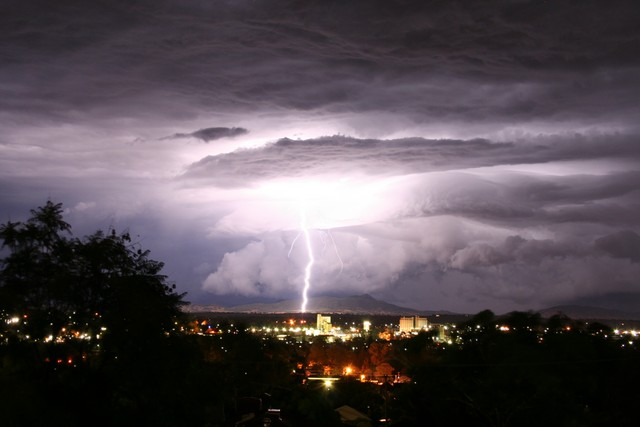
A thunderstorm in Tamworth, New South Wales, Australia

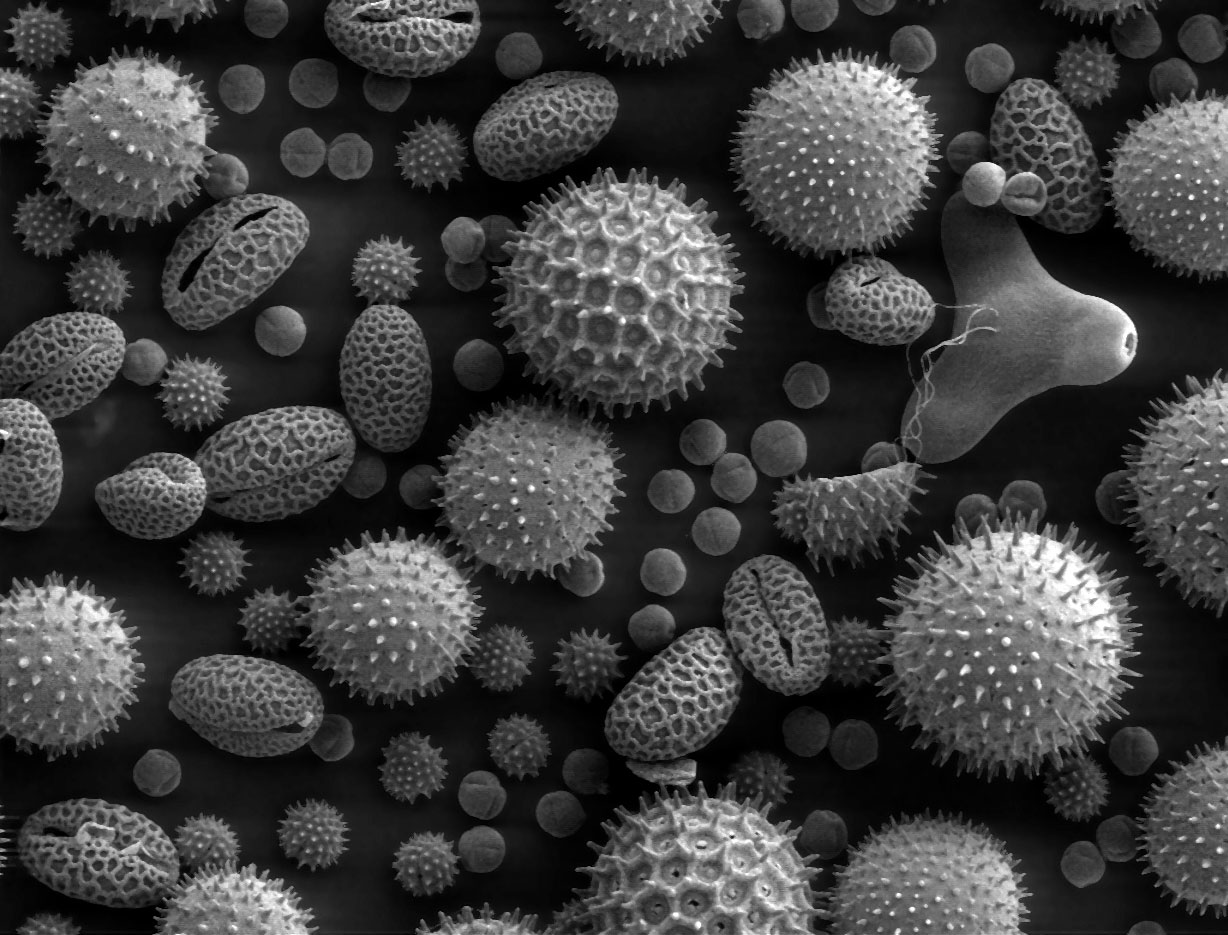
Scanning electron microscope image of pollen grains from a variety of common plants

Thunderstorm asthma (also referred to in the media as thunder fever or a pollen bomb) is the triggering of an asthma attack by environmental conditions directly caused by a local thunderstorm. Due to the acute nature of the onset and wide exposure of local populations to the same triggering conditions, severe epidemic thunderstorm asthma events can put significant and unmanageable stress on public health facilities.

Widely recognised but not fully understood, it has been proposed that during a thunderstorm, pollen grains can absorb moisture and then burst into much smaller fragments with these fragments being easily dispersed by wind. While larger pollen grains are usually filtered by hairs in the nose, the smaller pollen fragments are able to pass through and enter the lungs, triggering the asthma attack.

== History ==
The phenomenon of thunderstorm asthma has been recognised since the 1980s, with an event in Birmingham, England, in July 1983 often considered the first prominent example. A 2013 study which reviewed instances of abnormally high asthma-related admissions to emergency departments between 1983 and 2013 identified strong correlation between those instances and thunderstorms, while noting that such events were so rare that very little detailed research into the phenomenon had occurred.

A significant impetus in the study of the phenomenon occurred after an event in November 2016 in Melbourne, Australia. Recognised as the most severe epidemic thunderstorm asthma event on record, the onset overwhelmed the city's ambulance system and some local hospitals, saw a ten-fold increase in asthma cases presenting to emergency departments compared with average, and resulted in ten deaths. One month later, an epidemic thunderstorm asthma event in Kuwait resulted in at least 5 deaths and many admissions to the ICU.

Since then there have been further reports of epidemic thunderstorm asthma events in Wagga Wagga, Australia; London, England; Naples, Italy; Atlanta, United States; and Ahvaz, Iran.

== Statistics ==
Many of those affected during a thunderstorm asthma outbreak may have never experienced an asthma attack before.

It has been found 95% of those that were affected by thunderstorm asthma had a history of hayfever, and 96% of those people had tested positive to grass pollen allergies, particularly rye grass. A rye grass pollen grain can hold up to 700 tiny starch granules, measuring 0.6 to 2.5 μm, small enough to reach the lower airways in the lung.

== Prevention ==
Patients with a history of grass allergies should be tested for asthma and treated for the grass allergies and asthma if also present. Patients with known asthma should be treated and counseled on the importance of adherence to preventative medication protocols. Preventative treatment found useful for severe asthma includes Allergen immunotherapy (AIT) particularly sublingual immunotherapy (SLIT).

== Significant events ==
- 6 July 1983 – 7 July 1983: Birmingham, England
- 8 November 1987: Melbourne, Australia
- 29 November 1989 – 30 November 1989: Melbourne, Australia
- 24 July 1994 – 25 July 1994: London, England
- 30 October 1997: Wagga Wagga, Australia
- 4 June 2004: Naples, Italy
- 25 November 2010: Melbourne, Australia
- 2 November 2013: Ahvaz, Iran
- 21 November 2016: Melbourne, Australia
- 1 December 2016: Kuwait and Riyadh, Saudi Arabia
- 8 November 2022: Victoria, Australia
- 12 June 2023: Thames Valley, England
- 7 November 2023: Victoria, Australia
- 6 November 2024: Albury Wodonga, Australia.
