= Theater of War Productions =

American theater company

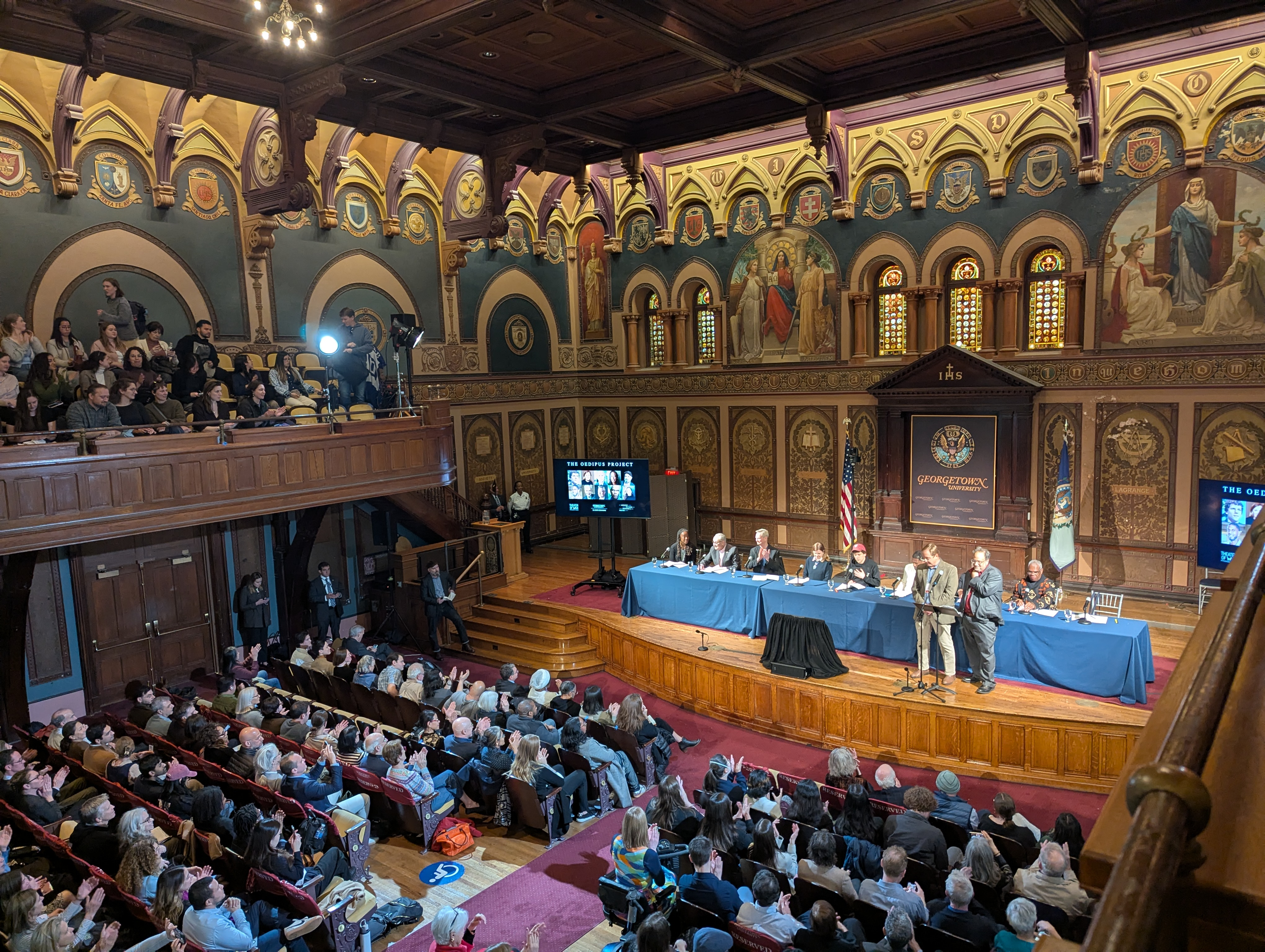
A reading of Oedipus Rex at Georgetown University

Theater of War Productions is a social impact theater company that produces readings of classic plays to address public health issues. The company grew out of the Theater of War Project, readings of Sophocles's Ajax and Philoctetes for military and civilian communities followed by a facilitated discussion.

Since the company's founding in 2008, their offerings have expanded to include readings of other classic plays aimed at addressing other subjects, such as dementia, police brutality, homelessness, addiction, and the COVID-19 pandemic.

== History ==
=== The Philoctetes Project ===
The story of Philoctetes deals with the wounded man and the interwoven relationships with others. In 2005, Bryan Doerries, writer and director, began a series of readings of the Sophocles play in the New York City area: the Philoctetes Project. He had noted the reactions of the audience to the reading, especially the reactions of audience members to the interaction of the suffering soldier and the conflicted caregiver. The project revolves around presenting such readings, especially to audiences of medical professionals and students.

A number of readings were followed by a panel discussion about doctor-patient relationships, involving presenters in psychiatry, physicians, and military medical personnel.

This model was first extended in 2007 with a presentation of Philoctetes for the first year medical class at Weill Medical College of Cornell University. Following the reading, students and faculty discussed the difficulties students face when caring for patients with incurable diseases The presentation included a discussion of an actual case dealing with the patient-caregiver interactions that parallel the situation Sophocles presented.

=== Theater of War ===
In 2008, at a conference in San Diego dedicated to finding new ways to help US Marines recover from post-traumatic stress and other disorders after serving in Iraq or Afghanistan, four New York actors presented a dramatic reading from Philoctetes and Ajax. The plays focused on physical and psychological wounds inflicted on the warrior.

Doerries began presenting the readings of the two plays as the Theater of War project, co-founding Theater of War Productions with Phyllis Kaufman. In 2009, they began presenting the project at US military installations abroad, including in Kuwait, Qatar, and Guantánamo Bay.

Theater of War have performed in the UK presented by the military charity Glen art with actors Lesley Sharp and Jason Isaacs at Edinburgh Castle and The Southbank Centre in London in 2015.

In March 2018, Glen Art presented Theater of War's first performance in Scotland for a serving military audience.

In July 2020 the Scottish charity Bravehound joined with The Theater of War Project presenting an online performance with Jason Isaacs, Nyasha Hatendi, Lesley Sharp and David Elliot.

=== Other projects ===
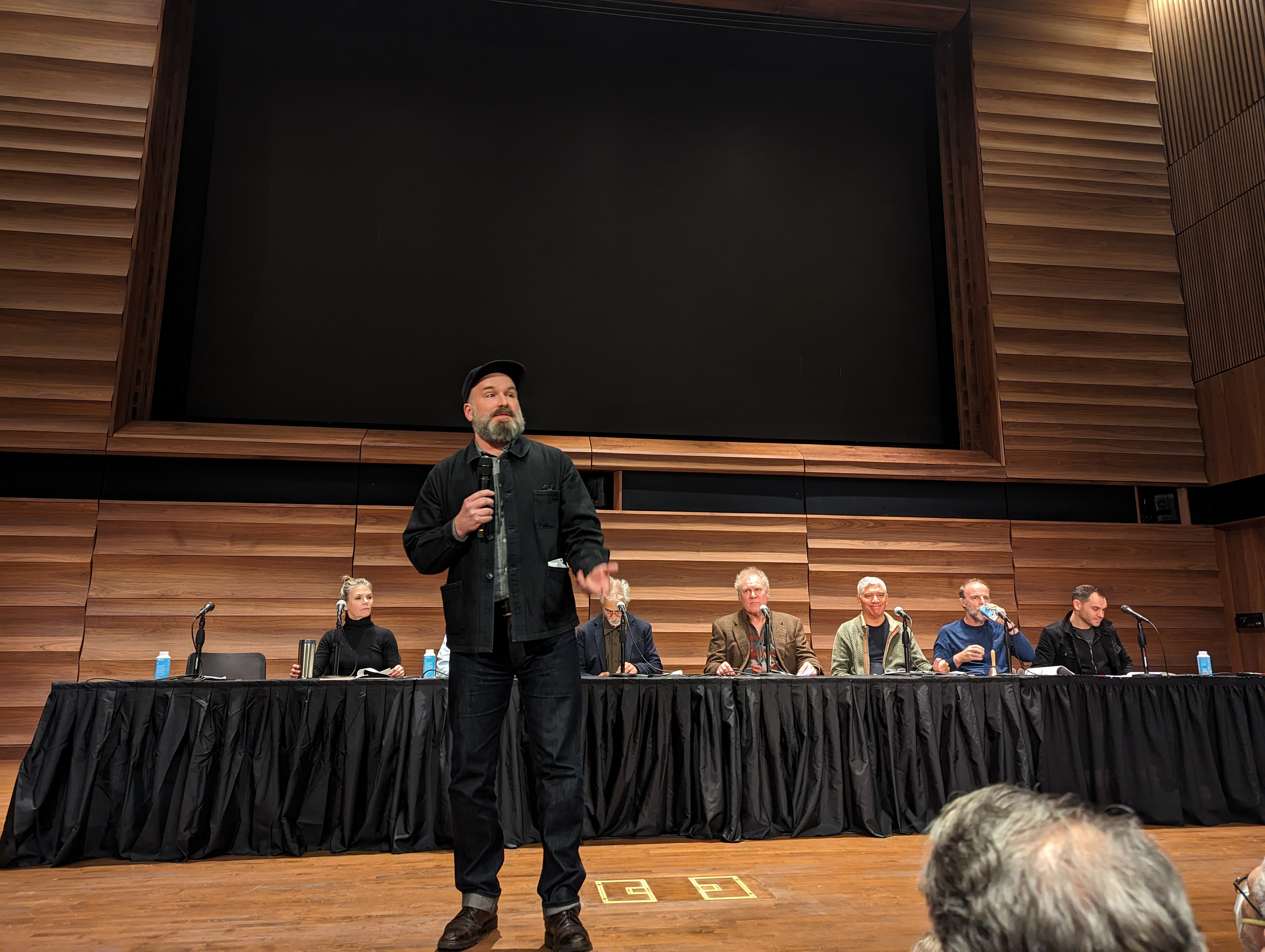
Bryan Doerries, artistic director of the Theater of War Project, introducing a reading of An Enemy of the People: A Public Health Project at the Johns Hopkins University Bloomberg Center in Washington, D.C.

Theater of War Productions has performed readings of Prometheus Bound in prisons, The Bacchae in rural communities to affected by the opioid crisis, The Madness of Heracles in neighborhoods impacted by gang and gun violence, and The Women of Trachis to speak to end of life care.

Antigone in Ferguson was first performed on September 17, 2016 at Normandy High School, which Michael Brown had attended. The project toured to New York City, Athens, Greece, and across the US.

Also in July 2020, the company presented The Oedipus Project, an online reading of scenes from Oedipus the King, translated and directed by Doerries, aimed at addressing the on-going COVID-19 pandemic. The reading was presented in partnership with the Brooklyn Public Library and the office of the New York City Public Advocate, and featured Oscar Isaac, Frances McDormand, Jeffrey Wright, Frankie Faison, and John Turturro as well as Public Advocate Jumaane Williams.

An online reading of The Nurse Antigone, a translation of Sophocles's Antigone, was produced by the company in March 2022 as the first of twelve readings in partnership with nursing organizations in the US. The reading, intended to address the challenges of frontline healthcare workers, featured three nurses, as well as the actors Bill Camp, Taylor Schilling, and author Margaret Atwood.

In February 2023, a reading of Ibsen's An Enemy of the People was presented at the National Academy of Sciences in Washington, DC, intended to speak to difficulties in communicating science to the public. The reading featured former National Institute of Health director Francis Collins alongside actor David Strathairn.

== Bibliography ==
- Doerries, Bryan (2016). The Theater of War: What Ancient Tragedies Can Teach Us Today. New York: Knopf Doubleday. ISBN 978-0-307-94972-1.
