= William Frankland (allergist) =

British allergist and immunologist (1912–2020)

William Frankland MBE
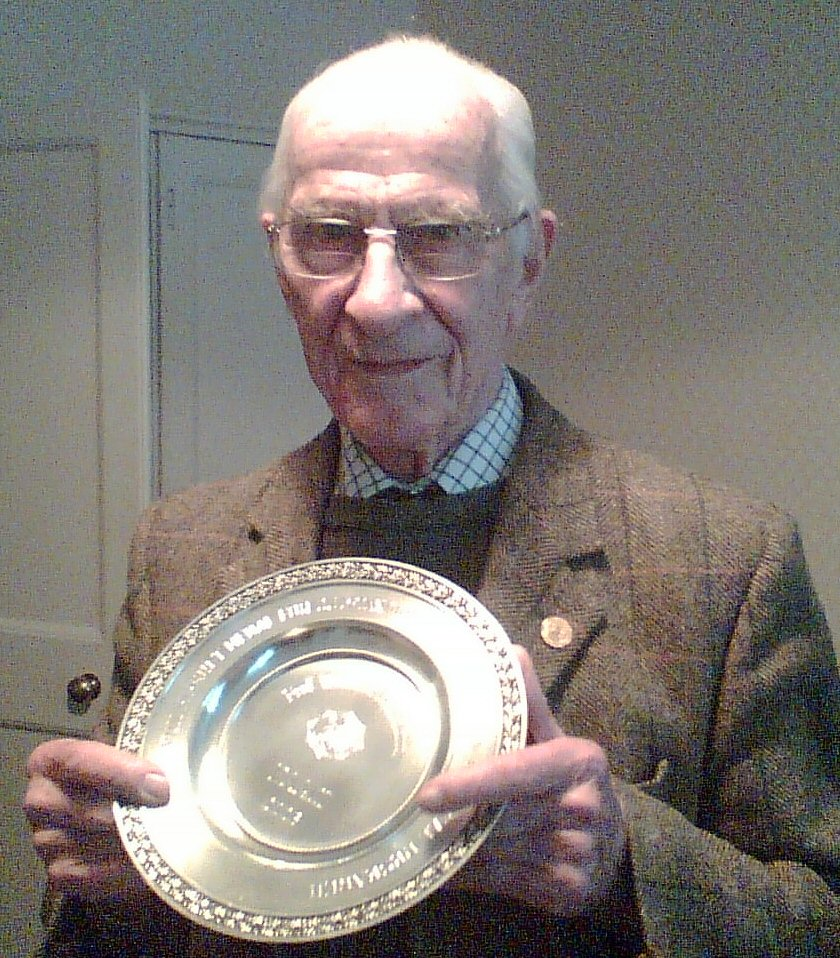
- Frankland in 2006
- Born: Alfred William Frankland; 19 March 1912; Battle, Sussex, England
- Died: 2 April 2020 (aged 108); London, England
- Education: University of Oxford; St Mary's Hospital Medical School
- Occupation: Allergist
- Military career
- Allegiance: Great Britain
- Branch: British Army
- Service years: 1939–1945
- Unit: Royal Army Medical Corps

Alfred William "Bill" Frankland MBE (19 March 1912 – 2 April 2020) was a British allergist and immunologist whose achievements included the popularisation of the pollen count as a piece of weather-related information to the British public, speculation regarding the effects of overly sterile living environments, and the prediction of increased levels of allergy to penicillin. He continued to work for a number of years after turning 100.

== Early life and education ==
Frankland was born in Battle, Sussex, England. His father was Rev. Henry Frankland, of North Yorkshire farming stock, who at the time of his son's birth was curate of St. Mark's, Little Common, near Bexhill-on-Sea, East Sussex, and in later years was a vicar in Cumberland. His mother, Alice (Rose), was the daughter of Henry West, a successful ironmonger of Barnsley. He was born an identical twin; his brother (the elder twin by fifteen minutes), Rev. John Ashlin Frankland, who worked in Sierra Leone in the 1950s, died in 1995 at age 83. They had an elder brother, Basil, who entered the fur trade in Canada, and an elder sister, Ella, who died aged 22 in 1933. Frankland reported that the family doctor was ineffective, and this motivated him to do better himself.

Frankland's childhood was spent in the Lake District, and he attended the preparatory school at Rossall School, Carlisle Grammar School, then St Bees School. He subsequently studied medicine at The Queen's College, Oxford, and St. Mary's Hospital Medical School, now part of Imperial College London.

== Military service ==
Frankland spent the war years 1939–45 in the Royal Army Medical Corps; initially at the Tidworth Medical Hospital, he later joined the Royal Warwickshire Regiment. In 1942, in the midst of the World War II (Pacific theatre), he was captured by the Japanese and held for three and a half years as a prisoner of war (POW) in Singapore. He would later recall: "Medically, as a prisoner of war, we saw conditions which are now unknown." As a POW, he was forced to provide medical assistance for Japanese troops, which Frankland believed saved his life.

== Post-war academic career ==
In 1946, Frankland began full-time work in the allergy department of St. Mary's Hospital, London. Frankland continued to contribute articles to academic journals beyond his official retirement and then his 100th birthday.

=== Hygiene hypothesis ===
Frankland believed that the rise in allergies results from increased cleanliness and the levels of hygiene in modern life—the so-called hygiene hypothesis. He said: "We don't set off our immune system early on, we are too clean. In the former East Germany for instance, with very poor work and housing conditions, people were less allergic".

=== Pollen count ===
Frankland was keen to provide patients he saw in London with information about pollens, such as the levels of pollen on any given day, and the times of the year when levels would tend to be at their highest. St. Mary's Hospital employed a botanist to assist with collecting this information and to complement the work on pollen counts.

=== Self-experimentation ===
Frankland was also a supporter of the idea of desensitisation, a technique that aims to reduce the level of immune response to allergens by repeated low doses of the substance to which the patient has an allergy. In 1955, Frankland experimented on himself by being bitten each day by the blood-sucking insect Rhodnius prolixus. He was assisted in this work by the London School of Hygiene & Tropical Medicine, which was able to supply insects that Frankland could be sure he had never previously been exposed to. The bites eventually provoked a severe anaphylactic reaction.

This research contributed to an understanding of how long injections of allergens would need to be given to achieve desensitisation. Results varied by individual, but immunity to pollen was found on average after three years. Immunity to venom-based allergens took longer and was found on average after five years.

=== Collaboration with Alexander Fleming ===
During the 1950s, Frankland served as an assistant to Alexander Fleming in the development of penicillin. The two had a daily meeting, but due to Fleming's lack of interest in clinical medicine, Frankland said that he could not recall a patient ever being discussed. Frankland and Fleming were also concerned with antimicrobial resistance to penicillin, with Frankland crediting Fleming with saying that careless prescription would inadvertently lead to "the death of man".

In 1954, Frankland published "Prophylaxis of summer Hay-fever and Asthma." The article reported the results of a trial involving 200 patients with previous histories of grass pollen sensitivity half treated with active vaccines, and half with inactive 'control' vaccines.

The results suggested that the active vaccines were much more effective in reducing allergy symptoms than the controls. The study was notable for being the first in the field that used randomised, controlled methods and a standardised approach to every patient. The trial, along with his work on the pollen count, was one of the contributing factors to Frankland being awarded the EAACI Noon Award for significant contributions to immunotherapy.

=== Saddam Hussein ===
In 1979 Frankland treated Iraq's then-president Saddam Hussein. Contacted to visit a VIP in Baghdad having trouble with asthma, Frankland advised Hussein this was not the case and to give up his habit of 40 cigarettes a day. Frankland said that "To my lasting regret, I told him that was his trouble and that if he carried on, in another two years he wouldn't be head of state. I heard sometime later that he had had a disagreement with his secretary of state for health, so he took him outside and shot him. Maybe I was lucky."

=== Retirement ===
Frankland retired from his job at St. Mary's Hospital, aged 65, and was then offered an unpaid consultancy role in the Department of Medicine at Guy's Hospital. He worked at Guy's on this basis for another twenty years on peanut anaphylaxis and paediatric allergies. After retiring from Guy's he continued to participate in academic life by attending conferences and publishing articles in journals.

In February 2012, Frankland appeared as an expert witness in a British court. The accused had claimed that a vehicle crash in which he was involved was caused by his losing control following a bee sting. Although Frankland agreed with the defence that such a scenario was possible, he gave an opinion that delayed-response reactions to bee stings only occurred after there had been initial symptoms following the sting. In this case, there had not been such symptoms, and the accused was found guilty.

In June 2015, at the age of 103, he was awarded an MBE for services to allergy research. In July he was the oldest recipient of the badge of the Order of Mercy. Also that year he appeared in an episode of the BBC 2 television series Britain's Greatest Generation, and was the oldest ever guest on Desert Island Discs.

Frankland continued to publish; at age 100 he authored "100 years of allergen immunotherapy", and most recently co-authored, "Flight Lieutenant Peach's observations on Burning Feet Syndrome in Far Eastern Prisoners of War 1942–45" in the journal QJM in 2016 (aged 104).

In March 2020, in an interview for his 108th birthday during the COVID-19 pandemic, he recounted some memories of the 1918 Spanish Flu pandemic. Frankland died on 2 April 2020 at the age of 108 of COVID-19.

== Professional and charitable associations ==
=== British Society for Allergy and Clinical Immunology ===
Frankland was instrumental in the creation of the British Society for Allergy and Clinical Immunology (BSACI). It was formed in 1948 under the name the British Association of Allergists. The speakers at the Association's inaugural meeting included Sir Henry Dale, pharmacologist and chairman of the board at the Wellcome Trust, and Dr. John Freeman. In 1962 the Association became the British Allergy Society, and Frankland served as president between 1963 and 1966. The society became the British Society for Allergy and Clinical Immunology in 1973, which name it retains.

=== International Association of Aerobiology ===
Frankland was a founding member (in 1970) and president.

=== Anaphylaxis Campaign ===
Frankland was president of the Anaphylaxis Campaign, the UK charity for severe allergy issues.

== Personal life ==
Frankland was married to Pauline Jackson, an optometrist, in 1941. They had two sons and two daughters.

== Legacy ==
The William Frankland Award for Outstanding Services in the field of Clinical Allergy is awarded each year at the annual meeting of the British Society for Allergy & Clinical Immunology. The allergy clinic at St Mary's Hospital is named in his honour.
