= Walking With The Wounded =

British charity

- Abbreviation: WWTW
- Formation: 2010
- Type: Charity
- Purpose: Supporting wounded former British Armed Forces servicemen and women
- Headquarters: Manchester
- Region served: United Kingdom
- Official language: English
- Leader: Ed Parker, Simon Daglish (co-founders)
- Website: http://walkingwiththewounded.org.uk/

Walking With The Wounded (WWTW) is a British charity to help injured former British Armed Forces servicemen and women in their career transition from the military to civilian life.

== History and objectives ==
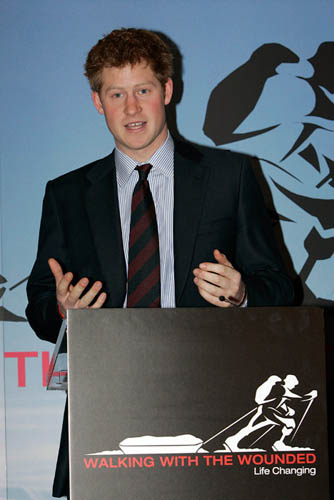
Prince Harry speaking at the launch of Walking With The Wounded on 1 March 2010

The charity was launched in 2010 by ex-servicemen Ed Parker and Simon Daglish; Parker's nephew having been seriously injured with the loss of both legs in 2009. Examples of funding by the charity include lodgings for former members of the UK Armed Forces and residential vocational courses to set them on a new career path after their initial medical care and rehabilitation.
