= List of maritime disasters in World War I =

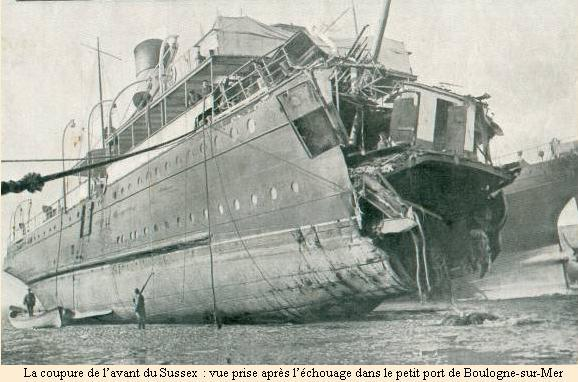

A maritime disaster is an event which usually involves a ship or ships and can involve military action. Because of the nature of maritime travel, there is often a substantial loss of life. This list covers those disasters in which 30 or more lives were lost during World War I.

Year	Country	Description	Lives lost	Use	Image
1916	Italy	Principe Umberto – On 8 June the steamship and another transport were carrying troops escorted by four Regia Marina destroyers and one scout cruiser. The Austro-Hungarian U-5 torpedoed her and she sank quickly, killing 1,926 of the 2,821 men aboard.	1,926	Military	
1914	United Kingdom	HMS Cressy, HMS Aboukir & HMS Hogue – In the action of 22 September 1914, three British ships were sunk by SM U-9. After Aboukir was torpedoed it was mistakenly thought that the ship had hit a mine and the remaining ships approached to rescue the crew. Hogue and then Cressy were then torpedoed and sunk. 1,397 men were lost; 837 were rescued.	1,397	Navy	
1916	France	Gallia – The troop ship was carrying more than 2,000 French and Serbian troops and a cargo of artillery and ammunition to Greece. She was unescorted, and on 8 October U-35 torpedoed her in the Mediterranean between Sardinia and Tunisia. Her munitions exploded and she sank in 15 minutes. Survivors were rescued from the water the next day.	1,338	Military	
1916	United Kingdom	HMS Queen Mary – the battlecruiser exploded and sank in the Battle of Jutland on 31 May, killing 1,245 men.	1,245	Navy	
1915	United Kingdom	RMS Lusitania – The passenger liner was torpedoed by U-20 on 7 May. She sank in just 18 minutes 8 nmi (15 km) off the Old Head of Kinsale, Ireland killing 1,197 out of the 1,960 of the people aboard.	1,197	Civilian	
1916	United Kingdom	HMS Invincible – a British battlecruiser that exploded and sank in the Battle of Jutland on 31 May. 1,026 men were lost; six survived.	1,026	Navy	
1916	United Kingdom	HMS Indefatigable – Battlecruiser, she sank in the Battle of Jutland on 31 May, killing 1,015 men. There were two survivors.	1,015	Navy	
1916	France	La Provence – on 26 February the French auxiliary cruiser was taking troops from France to Salonika when U-35 sank her in the Mediterranean south of Cape Matapan. Nearly 1,000 men were lost.	1,000 maximum	Military	
1915	United Kingdom	HMT Royal Edward – a submarine sank the troop ship on 13 August, killing 935 people.	935	Military	
1916	United Kingdom	HMS Defence – Armoured Cruiser, exploded in the Battle of Jutland on 31 May. 903 men were lost, there were no survivors.	903	Navy	
1914	United Kingdom	HMS Good Hope – She was sunk on 1 November off the Chilean coast along with HMS Monmouth in the Battle of Coronel by the German armoured cruisers SMS Scharnhorst and SMS Gneisenau. Her entire complement of 900 was lost.	900	Navy	
1918	Italy	Verona – On 11 May the troop ship was off Capo Peloro in Sicily and heading for Libya, when UC-52 torpedoed and sank her. She sank quickly, killing 880 of about 3,000 troops aboard.	880	Military	
1917	Italy	Minas – On 15 February the troop transport was carrying Italian, Serbian and French troops from Taranto to Salonica, was torpedoed and sunk by U-39 off Cape Matapan. 870 men were lost.	870	Military	
1916	United Kingdom	HMS Black Prince – Armoured Cruiser, was sunk in the Battle of Jutland on 31 May, with the loss of 857 men, the entire crew.	857	Navy	
1914	Germany	SMS Scharnhorst – German armoured cruiser sunk in the Battle of the Falkland Islands by the British battlecruiser HMS Inflexible, killing all 860 occupants aboard, including Admiral Maximilian von Spee.	860	Navy	
1917	United Kingdom	HMS Vanguard – Just before midnight on 9 July at Scapa Flow, the battleship suffered an explosion, probably caused by an unnoticed stokehold fire heating cordite stored against an adjacent bulkhead in one of the two magazines that served the amidships gun turrets "P" and "Q". She sank almost instantly, killing an estimated 843 men; there were two survivors.	843	Navy	
1916	Germany	SMS Pommern – Pre Dreadnought, she was torpedoed by the destroyer HMS Onslaught, exploded and sank at the Battle of Jutland on the early morning hours of 1 June with her entire crew of 839 men.	839	Navy	
1914	United Kingdom	HMS Bulwark – the pre-dreadnought battleship exploded at her moorings on the Medway off Kingsnorth, Kent, on 26 November, killing all but nine of her 805 men.	794	Navy	
1917	France	Athos – torpedoed on 17 February by U-65, 180 nautical miles (330 km) south east of Malta. The ship sank in 14 minutes, killing 754 of the 1,950 aboard.	754	Military	
1915	Germany	SMS Blücher – At the Battle of Dogger Bank on 24 January the German warship, under heavy fire from British ships, was sunk and British destroyers began recovering the survivors. However, the destroyers withdrew when a German zeppelin began bombing them mistaking the sinking Blücher for a British battlecruiser. The number of casualties is unknown with figures ranging from 747 to around 1,000.	747–1,000	Navy	
1918	Austria-Hungary	Linz – On 19 March the Austro-Hungarian steamship struck a mine and quickly sank off Shëngjin, Albania. 970 to 1,003 people (including 413 Italian POWs) were registered as being aboard, but sources stated that also hundreds of unregistered Austro-Hungarian soldiers on leave had boarded her. At least 685 were lost. Other sources put the number of dead from more than 700 to more than 1,000.	685-1000	Military	
1915	France	Le Calvados – This troopship with some 800 soldiers on board was torpedoed on 4 November by German submarine SM U-38 between Marseille and Oran. There were only 55 survivors.	740	Military	
1915	France	Léon Gambetta – On the night of 27 April the French cruiser was patrolling in the Ionian Sea 15 nautical miles (28 km) south of Santa Maria di Leuca. The Austro-Hungarian U-5 hit her with two torpedoes and she sank in 10 minutes. Of 821 men aboard 684 including Contre-amiral Victor Baptistin Sénès were lost along with all officers. There were 137 survivors.	684	Navy	
1916	Italy	Regina Margherita – On 11 December the Italian pre-dreadnought battleship struck two mines, capsized and quickly sank in the gulf of Valona, Albania. 678 of the 949 people aboard (37 officers, 760 enlisted men and 162 officers and soldiers traveling as passengers), including the former commander of the Italian expeditionary corps in Albania, lieutenant general Oreste Baldini, were lost.	678	Navy	
1914	United Kingdom	HMS Monmouth – the armoured cruiser was sunk on 1 November off the Chilean coast along with HMS Good Hope in the Battle of Coronel. There were no survivors from Monmouth's complement of 678.	678	Navy	
1915	Germany	SMS Prinz Adalbert – On 2 July, the British submarine HMS E9 torpedoed and badly damaged Prinz Adalbert near Gotland. On 23 October, HMS E8 torpedoed Prinz Adalbert 20 mi (32 km) west of Libau. The magazine exploded and the ship sank, killing 672 crew. There were three survivors.	672	Navy	
1916	France	Suffren – The battleship was returning to Lorient for a refit when on 26 November, off the Portuguese coast near Lisbon, she was torpedoed by U-52. The torpedo detonated a magazine and Suffren sank within seconds, taking the crew of 648 with her.	648	Navy	
1917	United Kingdom	Mendi – On 21 February the passenger ship was taking members of the 5th Battalion, South African Native Labour Corps, to France. At 05:00 hrs, while under the escort of the destroyer HMS Brisk, Mendi was struck and cut almost in half by SS Darro. Of 823 people aboard, 646 were lost.	646	Military	
1918	Japan	Kawachi – On 12 July the Japanese battleship suffered an explosion in her ammunition magazine. Two minutes later she began to list to starboard and capsized four minutes after the explosion. Over a thousand men were aboard Kawachi at the time of the explosion and 621 of them were lost; 433 survived.	621	Navy	
1917	United Kingdom	HMT Aragon – On 30 December SM UC-34 torpedoed the troop ship off Alexandria, Egypt. Her escort, the destroyer HMS Attack, rescued 300 to 400 survivors but then UC-34 sank her as well. Of 2,700 personnel and crew aboard Aragon, 610 were lost in the two attacks.	610	Military	
1918	France	Sant Anna – This troopship, traveling from Marseille over Bizerte to Salonica, with 2,025 soldiers on board was torpedoed on 11 May by German submarine SM UC-54. There were 605 casualties.	605	Military	
1915	France	Bouvet – Sunk by a mine in the Dardanelles Campaign on 18 March. The battleship capsized and sank within two minutes, taking more than 600 crew with her.	600	Navy	
1916	United Kingdom	HMS Hampshire – On 5 June the cruiser was in a heavy sea about 1.5 nautical miles (2.8 km) off Orkney between Brough of Birsay and Marwick Head, when she suffered an explosion that holed her between her bows and bridge. She heeled to starboard. When her lifeboats were lowered, the heavy sea smashed them against her side. About 15 minutes after the explosion she sank by her bow. Of more than 600 men, only 12 on two Carley floats reached the shore.	600	Navy	
1914	Russia	Pallada – On 11 October Pallada was torpedoed by U-26. The exploding torpedo set off the ship's ammunition and within a few minutes the cruiser sank along with her entire crew of 597. She was the first Russian warship sunk in World War I.	597	Navy	
1914	Germany	SMS Gneisenau – A sister ship of SMS Scharnhorst, she was sunk in the same battle as her sister, by British cruisers, taking 596 men with her.	596	Navy	
1916	Germany	SMS Wiesbaden – In the Battle of Jutland on 1 June a shell from HMS Invincible hit the German light cruiser, exploded in her engine room and disabled her. Light cruisers of the British 3rd and 4th Light Cruiser Squadrons also battered her with their main guns. The ship sank sometime between 01:45 and 02:45 hrs. One crew member survived; 589 were lost.	589	Navy	
1915	United Kingdom	HMS Goliath – On the night of 12–13 May, Goliath was anchored in Morto Bay off Cape Helles when she was torpedoed. Goliath began to capsize almost immediately, she rolled over and began to sink by the bow, taking 570 of the 700-strong crew to the bottom.	570	Navy	
1918	Austria-Hungary	Euterpe – On 11 August the Austro-Hungarian troopship was torpedoed and sunk by the Italian submarine SMG F-7 off Pag Island. 555 of the 1,000 Austro-Hungarian troops aboard were lost.	555	Military	
1915	United Kingdom	HMS Formidable – On 1 January, the pre-dreadnought battleship was torpedoed by U-24, she capsized and sank in the English Channel. Of her 780 complement, 35 officers and 512 men were lost.	547	Navy	
1914	United Kingdom	HMS Hawke – torpedoed in the North Sea off Aberdeen by U-9 on 15 October with the loss of 524 out of 594 officers and crew.	524	Navy	
1918	United Kingdom	RMS Leinster – The ferry was torpedoed and sunk by UB-123 on 10 October, while bound for Holyhead. More than 500 people were lost: the greatest single loss of life in the Irish Sea.	500	Military	
1914	Germany	SMS Cöln – the light cruiser was sunk in the Battle of Heligoland Bight on 28 August, killing 485 people.	485	Navy	
1919	France	Chaouia – On 15 January, 2 months after the end of the War, the passenger steamer hit a mine in the Street of Messina, laid 3 months before by SM UC-53. The ship sank and 476 people were killed.	476	Civilian	
1915	Italy	Benedetto Brin – On 27 September the pre-dreadnought battleship was blown up by Austro-Hungarian sabotage in Brindisi harbor. 454 officers and crew were lost, including Rear Admiral Rubin de Cervin; 387 survived.	454	Navy	
1918	France	Djemnah – This troopship, traveling from Marseille to Madagascar, with 745 soldiers on board was torpedoed on 14 July by German submarine SM UB-105. There were 435 casualties.	435	Military	
1918	United Kingdom	HMS Otranto – was a passenger liner rebuilt as a troopship. On 6 October, while sailing in poor visibility in the rough seas, she collided with another liner turned troopship, the Cashmir. Otranto then struck and was grounded. With heavy seas pounding her against the rocks she eventually broke up and sank, killing 431 people.	431	Military	
1916	France	Amiral Charner – On 8 February the French cruiser was torpedoed and sunk in the Mediterranean Sea off Beirut by the Austro-Hungarian submarine U-36 and sank in two minutes. There was one survivor from her crew of 427.	426	Navy	
1918	France	Balkan – The troopship, traveling from Marseille to Corsica, with 519 passengers on board was torpedoed on 16 August by German submarine SM UB-48. There were 417 casualties.	417	Military	
1917	United Kingdom	Transylvania – The ship was torpedoed and sunk in the Gulf of Genoa on 4 May by U-63. She was carrying Allied troops to Egypt; 412 people were killed.	412	Military	
1914	Germany	SMS Yorck – on 4 November the German cruiser accidentally ran into a German minefield and was sunk; killing several hundred people.	400	Navy	
1916	United Kingdom	HMS Natal – On 30 December the armored cruiser and her squadron were at anchor in Cromarty Firth. A series of violent explosions tore through her after part and in five minutes she capsized with loss of 394 crew and civilians. The Admiralty court-martial into the cause of her loss concluded that it was an internal ammunition explosion possibly due to faulty cordite.	390–421	Navy	
1914	Germany	SMS Cöln – On 28 August at the Battle of Heligoland Bight, the German light cruiser was hit several times by British battlecruisers' main guns but managed to escape in the haze. She inadvertently turned back toward them and was quickly disabled when battle resumed. Her crew abandoned her as she capsized and sank but German vessels did not search the area for three days. One of her 367 men survived.	366	Navy	
1917	United Kingdom	Laurentic – The ship struck two mines off Lough Swilly in northwest Ireland on 25 January and sank within an hour. 354 aboard were killed; 121 survived.	354	Military	
1914	United Kingdom	HMS Princess Irene – The minelayer exploded and sank off Sheerness, Kent killing 352 people.	352	Navy	
1917	France	Medjerda – This troopship, traveling from Oran to Port Vendres, with 575 soldiers on board was torpedoed on 11 May by German submarine SM U-34. There were 344 casualties.	344	Military	
1915	United Kingdom	Persia – The P&O liner was torpedoed and sunk without warning off Crete on 30 December by U-38. She sank in 5–10 minutes, killing 343 of the 519 aboard.	343	Civilian	
1914	Germany	SMS Nürnberg – In the Battle of the Falkland Islands on 8 December the light cruiser was sunk by HMS Kent. Of 334 aboard, seven survived.	327	Navy	
1916	Germany	SMS Frauenlob – In the Battle of Jutland the German cruiser was hit by a torpedo from HMS Southampton that cut her power and caused serious flooding. British 6-inch (150 mm) shellfire set Frauenlob's deck afire. She quickly capsized and sank, killing 12 officers and 308 men.	320	Navy	
1918	United States	USS Cyclops – On 4 March the Proteus-class collier left Barbados carrying manganese ore from Brazil. She was due in Baltimore on 13 March but never arrived. She and 306 people aboard were declared missing, and no wreckage or bodies were ever identified. This is the US Navy's single largest loss of life not directly involving combat. Her loss was never explained, but one sister ship USS Jason later developed structural faults and two others, Nereus and Proteus, vanished at sea in World War II. Also, Cyclops' starboard engine was out of action, she may have been overloaded, and on 10 March there was a storm off the Virginia Capes.	306	Navy	
1917	Japan	Tsukuba – On 14 January the Japanese cruiser exploded while in port at Yokosuka and sank with a loss of 305 men. The cause was later attributed to a fire in an ammunition magazine.	305	Navy	
1918	Austria-Hungary	SMS Viribus Unitis – On 1 November two men of the Regia Marina rode a primitive manned torpedo (nicknamed the Mignatta or "leech") into the Austro-Hungarian naval base at Pola. Using limpet mines they then sank the battleship with the loss of 300–400 men.	300–400	Navy	
1916	Italy	Brindisi – On 6 January the Italian steamship was sunk off Shëngjin, Albania by a mine laid by a German submarine UC-14. 300 Italian crew and 540 Serbian and Montenegrin troops (who had been enlisted among Serbian and Montenegrin émigrées in the US and Canada) were killed, only 145 crew and passengers survived. The ship left Halifax harbor for Europe in December 1915.	300	Military	
1917	France	Danton – She was torpedoed by U-64, commanded by Kapitänleutnant Robert Moraht on 19 March, south-west of Sardinia. The battleship was bound for the Greek island of Corfu to join the Allied blockade of the Strait of Otranto. The ship sank in 45 minutes. 806 men were rescued by the destroyer Massue, but 296, including Captain Delage, went down with the ship.	296	Navy	
1915	United Kingdom	HMS Viknor – The armed merchant cruiser was with the 10th Cruiser Squadron, commanded by Commander EO Ballantyne with 22 officers and 273 ratings. She sank with all hands on 13 January while patrolling in heavy seas off Tory Island, Ireland. It is thought she struck a German naval mine.	295	Navy	
1918	Japan	Hirano Maru – On 4 October, the Japanese liner had left Liverpool for Yokohama with 340 crew and passengers and general cargo on board. She was torpedoed in the Irish Sea during a strong hail by SM UB-91, killing 292 people.	292	Civilian	
1914	United Kingdom	HMS Clan Macnaughton – On 3 February, on patrol with the 10th Cruiser Squadron in the North Atlantic, the armed merchant cruiser disappeared with all hands. She is thought to have either foundered in a heavy sea, or struck a naval mine.	281–284	Navy	
1917	United Kingdom	Arcadian – On 15 April, en route from Salonica to Alexandria, the troop ship was sunk in the Aegean Sea 26 nautical miles (48 km) off Milos by SM UC-74, killing 279 people.	279	Military	
1916	Russia	Merkuriy – On 20 June, the ship on a voyage from Ochakov to Odessa struck a mine, laid by SM UC-15, and sank in the Black Sea 13 nautical miles (24 km) off Odessa with the loss of 272 lives.	272	Civilian	
1914	Japan	Takachiho – The cruiser was struck by three torpedoes launched by an Imperial German Navy S90 torpedo boat on 14 October in the Battle of Tsingtao. She sank with the loss of 271 men.	271	Navy	
1918	Italy	Tripoli – The Italian passenger steamship was torpedoed and sunk on 17 March off Sardinia by UB-49. She sank slowly, but 268 out of the 457 people aboard were killed. Other sources report 288 killed and 189 survivors, or more than 300 victims.	268–288	Civilian	
1914	Germany	SMS Leipzig – was a light cruiser that was sunk in action at the Battle of the Falkland Islands, 8 December with the loss of 268 men.	268	Navy	
1914	United Kingdom	HMS Pathfinder – On 5 September British cruiser was sunk off St. Abbs Head, Berwickshire, Scotland by U-21. A torpedo struck one of her magazines, which exploded, sinking her within minutes and killing 259 men.	259	Navy	
1916	United Kingdom; Germany	SMS Greif and RMS Alcantara – During the action of 29 February 1916, German merchant raider SMS Greif (1914) and British armed merchant cruiser RMS Alcantara (1913) sank each other northeast of Shetland. An estimated 187 Germans perished along with 72 Britons.	259	Navy	
1915	Ottoman Empire	Heireddin Barbarossa – The battleship was sunk on 8 August in the Dardanelles by the British submarine HMS E11 with the loss of 253 men.	253	Navy	
1915	Germany	SMS Bremen – On 17 December the light cruiser, with the torpedo boat V191, ran into a Russian minefield. Bremen struck two mines off Windau and sank as did V191. 250 men – the majority of Bremen's crew – were killed.	250	Navy	
1916	Italy	Leonardo da Vinci – the Italian battleship saw no action but was sunk by a magazine explosion on 2 August killing 21 officers and 227 enlisted men out of a crew of 1,156. The Italians blamed Austro-Hungarian saboteurs for her loss but it may have been caused by unstable propellant.	248	Navy	
1918	Canada	HMHS Llandovery Castle – On 27 June, the Canadian hospital ship was torpedoed off southern Ireland by U-86. When her crew took to the lifeboats, U-86 surfaced, ran down all but one of her lifeboats and shot at people in the water. Only the 24 people in the remaining lifeboat survived. 234 people were killed.	234	Navy	
1918	Austria-Hungary	Bregenz – On 13 May the Austro-Hungarian troop transport was torpedoed and sunk by the Italian motor torpedo boat MAS 99 in Durazzo harbour. 234 of the 1,192 troops and crew aboard were lost, and 958 were rescued.	234	Military	
1914	Germany	SMS Karlsruhe – en route to attack shipping lanes to Barbados on 4 November a spontaneous internal explosion destroyed the ship and killed most of the crew. The survivors used one of Karlsruhe's colliers to return to Germany in December 1914. Of the 373 aboard 140 survived.	233	Navy	
1916	Russia	Imperatritsa Mariya – On 20 October while she was at anchor off Sevastopol fire was discovered in her forward powder magazine, which exploded before any efforts could be made to fight it. Sailors had flooded the forward magazine before the explosion at the cost of their own lives. About 40 minutes after the first explosion a second occurred in the area of her torpedo flat that destroyed the watertightness in the rest of her forward bulkheads. She began to sink by her bow and listed to starboard. She capsized a few minutes later, taking 228 sailors with her. The subsequent investigation determined that the explosion was probably caused by spontaneous combustion of the ship's nitrocellulose-based propellant as it decomposed.	228	Navy	
1918	Italy	Perseo - On 4 May the troop transport, sailing from Messina to Cephalonia, was torpedoed and sunk by the Austro-Hungarian submarine U-4, killing 227 men.	227	Military	
1918	United Kingdom	HMS Louvain – on 21 January the Armed boarding steamer was torpedoed by UC-22 in the Aegean Sea, sailing from Malta to Mudros. She sank quickly, killing 224 people.	224	Navy	
1917	United Kingdom	HMT Cameronia – on 15 April she was torpedoed by U-33 while en route from Marseille, France, to Alexandria, Egypt. She was serving as a troopship, carrying about 2,650 soldiers. She sank in 40 minutes, 150 nautical miles (280 km) east of Malta, killing 210 people.	210	Navy	
1918	United Kingdom	HMT Tuscania – The British troopship was torpedoed on 5 February by UB-77 while taking US troops to Europe, and sank killing 210 people.	210	Military	
1917	France	Sequana – On 8 June, the troopship sailing between Dakar and Bordeaux was torpedoed and sunk 5 miles from the Île d'Yeu by SM UC-72 (Imperial German Navy) with the loss of 207 lives. Most casualties were Senegalese soldiers.	207	Military	
1915	Italy	Ancona – An Italian passenger steamship that was torpedoed and sunk on 8 November near the Gulf of Cagliari by U-38, causing a diplomatic crisis. Of the 446 passengers and 163 crew, 206 people were lost.	206	Civilian	
1917	France	Amiral Magon – On 28 January, the troopship on its way to the Salonika front was torpedoed and sunk west of Antikythera, Greece (35°49′N 20°02′E) by SM U-39 (Imperial German Navy) with the loss of 203 lives.	203	Military	
1914	Germany	SMS Ariadne – On 28 August in the Battle of Heligoland Bight the German light cruiser was attacked and sunk by two British battlecruisers. About 200 of her men were lost; 59 survived.	200	Navy	
1915	United Kingdom	HMS Bayano – The naval auxiliary was with the 10th Cruiser Squadron when on 11 March she was torpedoed by SM U-27 off Corsewall Point, near Stranraer, Schotland. She sank within minutes killing 196 of its crew. Only 26 men survived.	196	Navy	
1918	United Kingdom	HMS Narborough and HMS Opal – On 12 January the two destroyers were on night patrol in the Pentland Firth in a snow storm when they ran aground on the Pentland Skerries and were wrecked. A total of 188 from the two ships were lost. One survivor from Opal was found. Most of the dead were never found.	188	Navy	
1914	Austria-Hungary	SMS Zenta – On 16 August the cruiser was sunk by gunfire in the Battle of Antivari off the coast of Bar, Montenegro, killing 179 people.	179	Navy	
1914	Austria-Hungary	SS Baron Gautsch – On 13 August the Austro-Hungarian passenger steamship accidentally struck an Austro-Hungarian mine and quickly sank off Rovigno, Istria. The most reported figures are 177 people lost and 159 saved, but other sources state 120–160 lost and 190 saved out of 310–350 people (245–285 passengers and 65 crew) plus children, who were not registered, or more than 200 victims. She was carrying both civilians and Austro-Hungarian troops.	177	Civilian	
1914	United Kingdom	HMS Amphion – The first British loss in World War I, the scout cruiser struck a mine while on pre-arranged plan of search. About 150 of her men were lost, plus 18 of German POWs rescued from the minelayer Königin Luise.	168	Navy	
1915	United Kingdom	SS Marquette (1898) – Troopship torpedoed and sunk in the Aegean Sea 36 nautical miles (67 km) south of Salonica, Greece on 23 October by SM U-35 (Imperial German Navy), with the loss of 167 lives, (29 Crew, 10 Nurses, 128 Troops) out of 741 people on board.	167	Military	
1917	Russia	Peresvet – On 4 January the Russian battleship caught fire and sank after striking two mines, one forward and the other abreast a boiler room, north of Port Said, Egypt. Of 771 aboard 167 were killed.	167	Navy	
1918	United Kingdom	HMHS Glenart Castle – On 26 February the hospital ship was hit and sunk by a torpedo from UC-56. Evidence suggested the submarine crew may have shot at initial survivors of the sinking in an effort to cover up the sinking. The body of one of her junior officers, recovered from the sea near where she sank, had two gunshot wounds. His body also wore a life vest indicating he was shot while trying to abandon ship. Few survivors were reported; 162 people were killed.	162	Navy	
1918	United Kingdom	Burutu – On 3 October, while travelling as part of a convoy in the Irish Sea in bad weather, the steamship was struck on the port side by the stern of City of Calcutta and is said to have sunk within 10 minutes. The two vessels were travelling in separate convoys and, in accordance with Admiralty orders, were steaming without lights. About 160 people were killed.	160	Civilian	
1915	United Kingdom	HMS India - hired by the Admiralty on 13 March as an armed merchant cruiser and serving in the 10th Cruiser Squadron. On 8 August she stopped off Helligvaer, near Bodø, Norway, to inspect a suspected blockade runner and was torpedoed by U-22. She sank with the loss of 10 officers and 150 ratings. The surviving 22 officers and 119 men were taken to Narvik.	160	Navy	
1916	Italy	Letimbro – On 29 July the steamship was sailing from Benghazi to Syracuse, Sicily when U-139 shelled and torpedoed her. Of at least 208 people aboard, 52 survived. Other source does not include the 80+ soldiers among the 150 passengers, increasing the number of people aboard to at least 288 and the number of victims to at least 236.	156+	Civilian	
1917	United Kingdom	SS Eloby (1913) – The Eloby was carrying French troops from Italy to the Salonika front when she was torpedoed and sunk in the Mediterranean Sea 75 nautical miles (139 km) south east by east of Malta (35°11′N 15°38′E) by SM U-38 ( Kaiserliche Marine) with the loss of over 156 lives : 56 British crew and more than 100 French soldiers from the 1st Regiment Mountain Artillery.	156+	Military	
1916	United Kingdom	SS Maloja – the P&O passenger liner sank after striking a mine in the English Channel off Dover. She ran her engines astern to stop herself, but then could not stop them again as her engine room flooded. Numerous vessels came to assist, but her evacuation and rescue were hampered by her 75 degree list and her continuing to run astern. 155 passengers, officers and Lascar crew were killed.	155	Civilian	
1915	United Kingdom	HMS Irresistible – Sank after striking a mine while engaged in battle in the Dardanelles on 18 March. 150 of her men were lost.	150	Navy	
1915	United Kingdom	HMHS Anglia – On 17 November the British hospital ship was returning from Calais to Dover, carrying 390 wounded officers and men. At around 1230 hrs, 1 nautical mile (1.9 km) east of Folkestone Gate, Anglia struck a mine. The nearby torpedo gunboat HMS Hazard helped evacuate the passengers and crew. Despite the assistance of the nearby collier Lusitania 134 people were lost.	134	Navy	
1914	Germany	SMS Emden – On 9 November the German cruiser was heavily damaged in the Battle of Cocos and was run aground to prevent her sinking. Of the 376 aboard 133 were killed in the battle.	133	Navy	
1918	United States	USCGC Tampa - on 26 September, sailing independently having departed convoy HG 107 after successfully escorting it from Gibraltar into the North Sea, Tampa was spotted by UB-91 and torpedoed in the Bay of Bristol. All 111 Coast Guardsmen, 4 U.S. Navy personnel, and 16 British personnel were lost.	131	U.S. Coast Guard	
1917	United Kingdom	HMHS Salta – On 10 April, while returning to pick up wounded at the port of Le Havre, France, the British hospital ship struck a mine 1 nautical mile (1.9 km) north of the entrance to the dam. A huge explosion smashed her hull near the stern in her engine room and hold number three. She listed to starboard and she sank within 10 minutes. Of 205 people aboard, 79 were lost. The British patrol boat HMS P-26 tried to come alongside to assist but also struck a mine and sank.	130	Navy	
1918	United Kingdom	HMS Raglan – On 20 January, while the battleships HMS Agamemnon and Lord Nelson were absent, Raglan and other members of the Detached Squadron of the Aegean Squadron were attacked by the Turkish battlecruiser Yavuz Sultan Selim, light cruiser Midilli and four destroyers. Raglan was sunk, killing 127 people.	127	Navy	
1916	United Kingdom	HMS Russell – The pre-dreadnought battleship was off Malta early on 27 April when she struck two mines laid by SM U-73. Fire broke out in her after part and the order abandon ship was given. There was an explosion near her after 12 inches (300 mm) turret and she took on a dangerous list, but she sank slowly letting most of her crew escape. 27 officers and 98 ratings were lost.	125	Navy	
1918	United Kingdom	HMAT Warilda – The troop ship was serving as a hospital ship, and was accordingly painted white with a green waistband and large red crosses. Nevertheless, on 3 August when she was taking wounded soldiers from Le Havre, France, to Southampton, England, she was torpedoed by SM UC-49. As with a number of other hospital ships torpedoed in the war, Germany claimed she was also carrying arms. She sank in about two hours, and of the 801 people aboard 123 were killed.	123	Navy	
1917	United Kingdom	SS Ivernia – Troopship transporting more than 2400 British soldiers from Marseille to Alexandria, torpedoed and sunk 58 nautical miles (107 km) south-east of Cape Matapan, Greece on 1 January by SM UB-47 (Imperial German Navy), with the loss of 120 lives, (35 crew, 85 troops).	120	Military	
1918	France	Pampa – This troopship, travelling from Marseille over Bizerte to Salonika was torpedoed on 27 August by German submarine SM UC-22. There were 117 casualties.	117	Military	
1918	Italy	Cesare Rossarol – On 16 November off Lisignano in Istria the Italian scout cruiser struck a mine that almost instantly tore her in two. Her bow quickly sank vertically while her severely stern rose 30 metres (98 ft) out of the water and drifted for 100 metres (330 ft) before sinking. 18 other ships arrived at the site but most of her crew were trapped in her hull and went down with the ship. Seven officers and 93 petty officers and ratings were lost; 34 survived.	100	Navy	
1916	Russia	HS Portugal – On 30 March the Russian hospital ship was towing a string of small flat-bottomed boats to ferry wounded from the shore. Off Rizeh, on the Turkish Black Sea coast she had stopped as one of the small boats was sinking and being repaired. U-33 fired a torpedo that missed, and then a torpedo at a depth of 30 feet, that hit near Portugal's engine room, breaking her in two. 90 of those aboard were lost.	90	Navy	
1914	Germany	SMS Mainz – On 28 August, in the Battle of Heligoland Bight, the German cruiser was sunk. British forces rescued 348 but 89 were lost when the ship capsized and sank.	89	Navy	
1914	Russia	Zhemchug – On 28 October the Russian cruiser was lost in the Battle of Penang. The ship was torpedoed and broke in two with the explosion, killing 89 crew and wounding 143 others.	89	Navy	
1914	United Kingdom	HMHS Rohilla – On 30 October the hospital ship struck Whitby Rock, a reef in the North Sea at Saltwick south of Whitby. At the time there was a fierce gale and due to wartime blackout conditions no landmarks were visible. Although she was only 600 metres (2,000 ft) from shore, the high sea and storm force winds made rescue difficult. Many of the 229 people aboard were saved; 85 were killed.	85	Navy	
1917	United Kingdom	HMS Mary Rose – on 17 October the British destroyer was escorting a convoy of 12 merchant ships from Norway when she was sunk about 70 nautical miles (130 km) east of Lerwick by the German cruisers SMS Brummer and Bremse. 83 of her men were killed.	83	Navy	
1918	United Kingdom	HMS Glatton – On 16 September, before she had gone into action, the coastal defence ship was at Dover when fire broke out in her midships magazine. Her crew were unable to contain the fire, and any explosion could detonate the munitions ship Gransha moored only 140 yards (130 m) away. HMS Cossack torpedoed Glatton in an attempt to flood the magazine, but the torpedoes were too small to breach her anti-torpedo bulge. Then HMS Myngs torpedoed Glatton, successfully flooding and capsizing her. 60 men were killed in the fire and 124 injured, of whom 19 later died of burns.	79	Navy	
1915	United Kingdom	HMS Triumph – On 25 May the pre-dreadnought battleship was torpedoed and sunk off Gaba Tepe by U-21 in the Gallipoli Campaign. The destroyer HMS Chelmer took off most of her crew before she capsized ten minutes later. She floated upside down for about 30 minutes then slowly sank in about 180 feet (55 m) of water. Three officers and 75 ratings were lost.	78	Navy	
1917	United Kingdom	HMS Ghurka – The destroyer was sunk by a mine on 8 February off Dungeness. Five of her 79 crew were rescued.	74	Navy	
1917	United States	USS Jacob Jones – On 6 December the destroyer was steaming independently from Brest, France to Queenstown, Ireland when she was torpedoed and damaged by U-53 and scuttled with the loss of 66 officers and men. She was the first US destroyer sunk by enemy action. She sank in eight minutes without making a distress call, but the German submarine commander took two badly injured US crew aboard and radioed the US base at Queenstown with the coordinates for the survivors.	66	Navy	
1917	Russia	Bditelnyi – The torpedo boat struck a mine, laid by the German SM UC-58, and sunk on 27 November south of Mäntyluoto, Pori, Finland. 57 of the crew and 2 Finnish pilots were lost.	59	Navy	
1918	United Kingdom	RMS Moldavia – The armed merchant cruiser was torpedoed and sunk on 23 May off Beachy Head in the English Channel by a torpedo from SM UB-57. At the time she was carrying US troops, 56 of whom were lost.	56		
1915	Italy	Giuseppe Garibaldi – On the night of 18 July the Italian cruiser was hit by a torpedo launched from the Austrian-Hungarian submarine U-4 off Dubrovnik. She sank in three minutes; 53 crew were killed.	53	Navy	
1916	France	Sussex – On 24 March the French passenger ferry was sailing from Folkestone to Dieppe when she was torpedoed by SM UB-29. She was severely damaged with her entire bow forward of her bridge blown off. Some of her lifeboats were launched, but at least two capsized and many passengers were drowned. Of 53 crew and 325 passengers at least 50 were killed, but a figure of between 80 and 100 is also suggested. Sussex remained afloat and was eventually towed stern-first into Boulogne harbour.	50-100	Civilian	
1918	United Kingdom	HMS Ariel – On 2 August, while minelaying in the western end of the Heligoland Bight, the British destroyer was sunk by a naval mine. In attempting to exit the minefield, after the destroyer HMS Vehement struck a mine and sank, theAriel struck a German mine, lost her bow and sank within an hour. 49 of her crew were lost.	49	Navy	
1915	United Kingdom	HMS Majestic – On 27 May, while stationed off W Beach at Cape Helles, Majestic became the third battleship to be torpedoed off Gallipoli in two weeks. SM fired one torpedo through the defensive screen of destroyers and anti-torpedo nets, hitting Majestic and causing a huge explosion. She began to list to port and in nine minutes capsized in 54 feet (16 m) of water killing 49 men. Her masts hit the mud of the sea bottom and her upturned hull remained visible for many months until it finally submerged when her foremast collapsed in a storm.	49	Navy	
1918	United Kingdom	HMS Vehement – On 2 August, while conducting minelaying in the western end of the Heligoland Bight, the British destroyer was sunk after striking a German mine. The explosion caused her forward magazine to detonate, blowing off the entire forepart of the ship forward of the forward funnel, and killing one officer and 47 ratings. Shortly afterward HMS Ariel suffered the same fate while leaving the minefield.	48	Navy	
1917	Austria-Hungary	SMS Wien – On the night of 9–10 December, while Wien and SMS Budapest were at anchor in Trieste, two Italian torpedo boats penetrated the harbor defenses undetected and fired several torpedoes at them. Budapest was not hit but Wien was struck by two torpedoes and sank in less than five minutes with the loss of 46 of her crew.	46	Navy	
1916	United Kingdom	HMS Eden – On 18 June the destroyer collided with the troop ship SS France in the English Channel. She sank with the loss of her commander and 42 officers and men; 33 officers and men were rescued by the troop ship. Her wreck lies in 34 m (112 ft) in the waters near Fécamp.	43	Navy	
1917	United Kingdom	HMHS Lanfranc – On the evening of 17 April the hospital ship, while carrying wounded from Le Havre to Southampton, was torpedoed by SM UB-40. 22 British and 18 Germans were killed.	42	Navy	
1917	United Kingdom	California – On 7 February, 38 nautical miles (70 km) west by south of Fastnet Rock, Ireland the transatlantic liner was hit by two torpedoes fired by SM U-85. She caught fire, and five people were killed in the explosion and 36 drowned either as she sank or when one lifeboat was swamped by her wake as she was still making way as she sank. She sank in nine minutes, killing 41 people.	41	Civilian	
1917	United Kingdom	HMHS Donegal – On 17 April the British hospital ship was torpedoed by UC-21 19 nautical miles (35 km) south of the Dean lightship while en route from Le Havre for Southampton. 40 of those aboard were lost.	40	Navy	
1916	Austria-Hungary	HS Tirol – On 16 April the Austrio-Hungarian hospital ship struck a mine off Durazzo killing 40. The ship was repaired and returned to service on 7 October 1916.	40	Navy	
1915	United Kingdom	HMS Recruit – On 1 May while patrolling with HMS Brazen, the destroyer was sunk by SM UB-6 30 nautical miles (56 km) south-west of the Galloper Light Vessel off the Thames Estuary. She broke in two and sank with the loss of 39 men; 4 officers and 22 crew were rescued.	39	Navy	
1917	United Kingdom	HMS Ariadne – On 26 July the cruiser was torpedoed and sunk off Beachy Head by SM UC-65. 38 people were lost.	38	Navy	
1916	Italy	HS Marechiaro – On 21 February the Italian hospital ship was sunk by a mine laid by SM UC-12, killing 33–200 people.	33-200	Navy	
1917	United Kingdom	HMS Paxton – British Q-ship sunk by German submarine U-46 on 20 May off the West coast of Ireland.	31	Navy	
1916	United Kingdom	HMHS Britannic – the hospital ship struck a mine on 21 November off the coast of Greece. 30 people were killed in an attempt to abandon the ship in two lifeboats without the captain's knowledge. They were sucked into the still moving propellers of the ship and destroyed. Even though she was the largest ship lost during the war, she did not get the fame like that of her sister the RMS Titanic.	30	Navy	

== See also ==
- List of hospital ships sunk in World War I
- List of maritime disasters
- List of maritime disasters in the 18th century
- List of maritime disasters in the 19th century
- List of maritime disasters in the 20th century
- List of maritime disasters in World War II
- List of maritime disasters in the 21st century
- Shipwreck
- List of shipwrecks
- List of disasters
- List of accidents and disasters by death toll
- List by death toll of ships sunk by submarines
- List of RORO vessel accidents
