= List of hospital ships sunk in World War I =

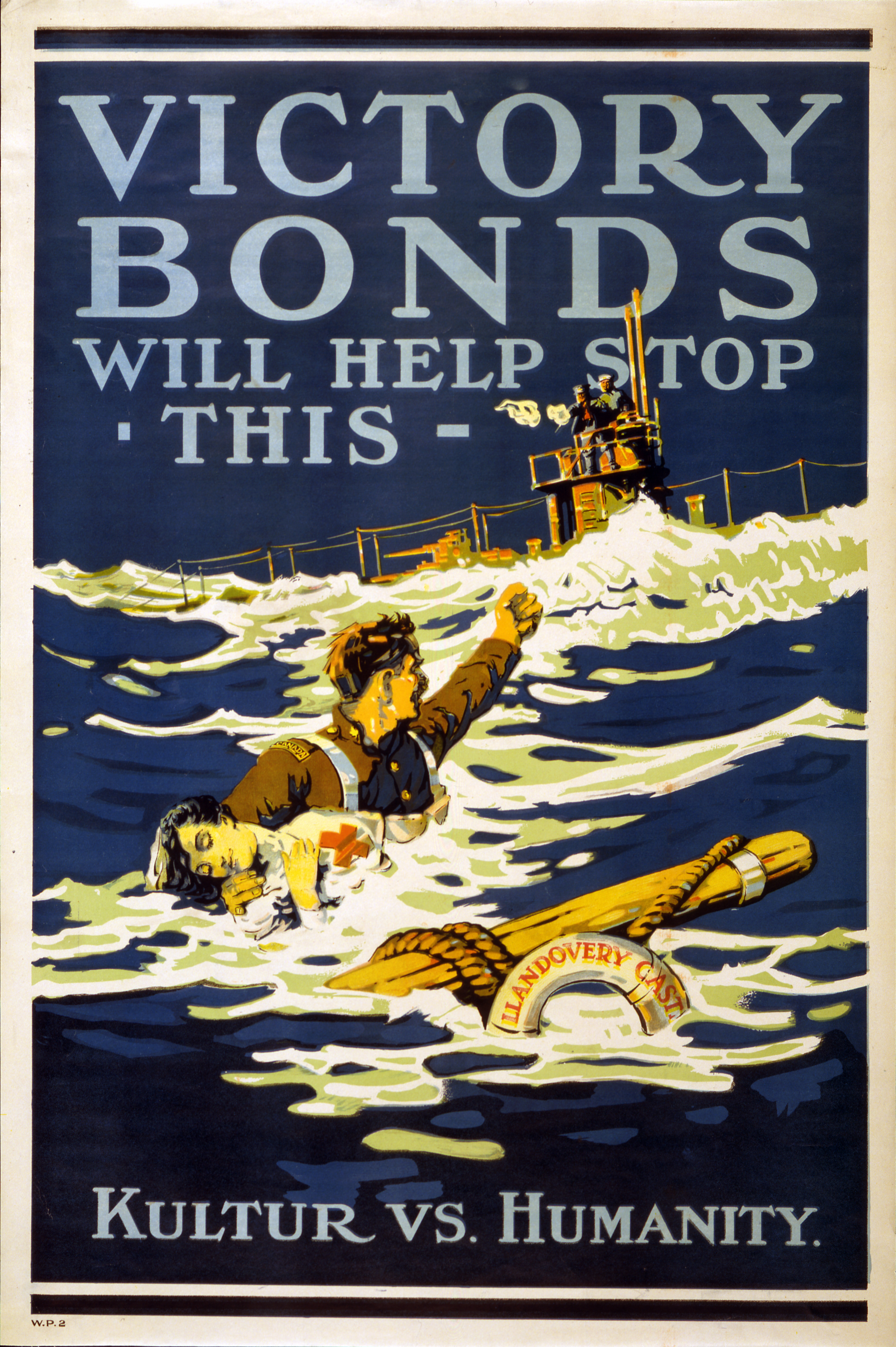
Llandovery Castle was hit with a torpedo from German U-boat U-86 on 27 June 1918. The U-boat then opened fire on the survivors.

During the First World War, many hospital ships were attacked, sometimes deliberately and sometimes as a result of mistaken identity. They were sunk by either torpedo, mine or surface attack. They were easy targets, since they carried hundreds of wounded soldiers from the front lines.

== Background ==
A hospital ship (HS) is designated for primary function as a medical treatment facility or hospital; most are operated by the military forces or navies of various countries around the world, as they are intended to be used in or near war zones. Hospital ships were covered under the Hague Convention X of 1907. Article four of the Hague Convention X outlined the restrictions for a hospital ship:

- The ship should give medical assistance to wounded personnel of all nationalities
- The ship must not be used for any military purpose
- Ships must not interfere or hamper enemy combatant vessels
- Belligerents as designated by the Hague Convention can search any hospital ship to investigate violations of the above restrictions.

If any of the restrictions were violated, the ship could be determined as an enemy combatant and be sunk. Investigators from neutral countries like Spain were allowed to inspect hospital ships to confirm that Article Four was not being violated.

The high command of Imperial Germany viewed Allied hospital ships as violating the Hague Convention and ordered its submarine forces to target them as part of their Unrestricted submarine warfare on Allied shipping. Even with the inspections from neutral countries the German High command alleged that hospital ships were violating Article Four by transporting able-bodied soldiers to the battleground. The biggest hospital ship sunk by either mine or torpedo in the First World War was Britannic, the sister of Olympic and the ill-fated Titanic. Britannic hit a mine on November 21, 1916; 30 people were killed, but the rest of the crew and passengers were able to escape. The largest loss of life caused by the sinking of a hospital ship would be Llandovery Castle. The ship was hit by a torpedo from the German U-boat U-86 on June 27, 1918. Shortly thereafter, the submarine surfaced and shot at most of the survivors; only 24 were rescued. After the war, the captain of U-86, Lieutenant Helmut Patzig, and two of his lieutenants were charged with war crimes and arraigned at the Leipzig war crimes trials, but Patzig disappeared, and the two lieutenants both escaped after being convicted and sentenced to prison. The Allies were not the only ones who had their ships attacked at the beginning of the war, the German hospital ship Ophelia was seized by British naval forces as a spy ship and near the close of the war the Austrian hospital ship Baron Call was unsuccessfully attacked by torpedo on October 29, 1918.

== Hospital ships sunk ==
Name	Image	Nationality	Date	Location of wreck	Cause	Lives lost	Note
HMHS Anglia	HMHS Anglia	UK	17 November 1915	One mile east of Folkestone Gate	Struck mine that had been laid by German U-boat UC-5	134	
HMHS Asturias	HMHS Asturias	UK	20 March 1917	6 miles off Start Point (Note: "Asturias" was beached near Bolt Head, but the damage was so extensive that she was declared a total loss. The government then bought and salvaged her, and she became a floating ammunition hulk at Plymouth for two years.)	Torpedoed by German U-boat UC-66	35	
HMHS Huntley (Note: Formerly known as the German hospital ship Ophelia, seized by the British and changed to Huntley)	German hospital ship Ophelia	UK	21 December 1915	.75 miles (1.21 km) off the Boulogne LV.	Torpedoed by German U-boat UB-10	2	
HMHS Britannic	Britannic	UK	21 November 1916	Aegean sea 37°42′05″N 24°17′02″E	Struck a mine laid by a German U-boat U-73	30	
HMHS Dover Castle	Dover Castle	UK	26 May 1917	Mediterranean Sea 37°45′00″N 007°45′00″E	Torpedoed by German U-boat UC-67	7	
HMHS Donegal	SS Donegal	UK	17 April 1917	19 miles south of the Dean lightship on passage Le Havre for Southampton 50°26′00″N 01°00′00″W	Torpedoed by German U-boat UC-21	40	
HS Elektra	HS Elektra	Austria-Hungary	18 March 1916	Off Cape Planka	Torpedoed by French submarine Ampère. Out of service until early Sep 1916; returned to her owner 04 Dec 1916	2	
HMHS Galeka	HMHS Galeka	UK	28 October 1916	French coast, near Le Havre 49°34′01″N 000°05′05″E	Struck a mine laid by UC-26	19	
HMHS Glenart Castle	HMHS Glenart Castle	UK	26 February 1918	Bristol Channel 51°07′00″N 005°03′00″W (Note: Glenart Castle hit a mine between Havre and Southampton on January 3, 1917 but did not sink and was able to make it to port for repairs)	Torpedoed by German U-boat UC-56	162	
HMHS Gloucester Castle	Gloucester Castle	UK	30 March 1917	en route from Le Havre to Southampton (Note: Ship was raised, salvaged and returned to service in 1919; in the Second World War she was sunk by Michel in 1942)	Torpedoed by German U-boat U-32	3	
HS Koningin Regentes	HS Koningin Regentes	Netherlands	06 June 1918	21 miles East of Leman lightship	Torpedoed by German U-boat UB-107	7	
HMHS Lanfranc	HMHS Lanfranc	UK	17 April 1917	English Channel 50°09′00″N 000°10′04″W	Torpedoed by German U-boat UB-40	40	
HMHS Letitia	HMHS Letitia	Canada	1 August 1917	Portuguese Cove, Halifax Harbour	Grounded out due to a pilot error in heavy fog	1	
HMHS Llandovery Castle	RMS Llandovery Castle 1907	Canada	27 June 1918	off southern Ireland 51°18′00″N 009°54′00″W	Torpedoed by German U-boat U-86	234	
HS Marechiaro	HS Marechiaro	Italy	21 February 1916	Off Cape Laghi, Durazzo, Albania	Struck a mine laid by German U-boat UC-12	33	
HS Oceania		Austria-Hungary	04 October 1918	Between Cape Rodoni and Durazzo	Mined and beached near Cape Rondoni, and on October 15, 1918 was blown up by the Austrians to avoid falling into Italian hands.	?	
HS Portugal (Португаль)	Hospital ship Portugal	Russia (French crew, Russian medical staff)	March 30 [O.S. March 17] 1916	Near Rize Province off the Turkish coast in the Black Sea	Torpedoed by German U-boat U-33 (Note: 1916 New York Times article claims that it was sunk by a Turkish sub)	90	
HMHS Rewa	HSRewa 1907	UK	4 January 1918	13 miles off Hartland Point, UK50°55′00″N 004°49′00″W	Torpedoed by German U-boat U-55	4	
HMHS Rohilla	SS Rohilla	UK	30 October 1914	Saltwick Nab, one mile south of Whitby	Struck Whitby Rock	84	
HMHS Salta	HMHS Salta	UK	10 April 1917	near Le Havre, France 49°32′08″N 00°02′18″W	Struck a mine laid by German U-boat UC-26	130	
HS Tabora	HS Tabora	German Empire	26 March 1916	Dar es Salaam harbour, East Africa	Sunk by gunfire from the British warships HMS Vengeance and HMS Challenger	?	
HS Tirol	HS Tirol	Austria-Hungary	16 April 1916	Off Durazzo	Mined. Returned to service 07 Oct 1916	40	
HS Vpered (Вперёд) (Note: Also transcribed as Vperiode, Vperyod, or Vperiod, sometimes mistranscribed with an l instead of i)	HS Vpered	Imperial Russia	8 July 1916	In the Black Sea, between Batoum and the Rize Province off the Turkish coast	Torpedoed by German U-boat U-38 (Note: 1916 New York Times article claims that it was sunk by a Turkish sub)	7	
HMAT Warilda	HMAT Warilda	Australia	3 August 1918	English Channel 50°12′08″N 000°16′4″W	Torpedoed by German U-boat UC-49	123	

Hospital ships had emblems like Red Cross

Hospital ships had emblems like Red Crescents

== See also ==
- List of hospital ships sunk in World War II
