= Kenneth Cummins =

Captain Kenneth Alfred Hugo Cummins (6 March 1900 – 10 December 2006) was, at age 106, one of the last surviving British veterans of the First World War. He served in the Royal Naval Reserve in the First World War as a (Temporary) Midshipman (15 July 1918 – 18 January 1919), and then in the Merchant Navy in the Second World War.

Kenneth Cummins was born in Richmond, London. His father was an officer in the Merchant Navy. He was educated at Merchant Taylors' School, Crosby, and was a member of the school's Officers' Training Corps when the Great War broke out. He joined P&O as a naval cadet aged 15. He trained at HMS Worcester for two years, then joined HMS Morea, an armed merchant cruiser on convoy duty from England to Sierra Leone, as a midshipman. On his first voyage, his ship encountered the wreckage of the Canadian hospital ship HMHS Llandovery Castle to the southwest of Fastnet rock. Against standing orders, the ship had been torpedoed and sunk by U-86 off the coast of Ireland, after which the submarine rammed and shelled the survivors in lifeboats, with only 24 of the 258 on board surviving. The corpses of many nurses were still floating in the water as Cummins passed by. The commander of the submarine, Lieutenant Helmut Patzig, and two other German officers were later tried in Germany for their actions.

Cummins became an officer for P&O after the war. He sailed to Australia, carrying troops home, where the ship was quarantined in Sydney Harbour after Spanish flu broke out on board. He later served on the steamship SS Macedonia, which brought Lord Carnarvon's body home from Egypt in 1923.

In the Second World War, he served as chief officer aboard RMS Viceroy of India, a 20,000-ton luxury liner requisitioned as a troopship, and used to land 2,000 men in North Africa during Operation Torch. The ship was torpedoed by U-407 at 4:30am on 11 November 1942, some 40 miles off the coast of Algeria, on its return journey to the UK. The ship sank so slowly that Cummins was able to change into his dress uniform before the order was given to abandon ship at 7am. Four members of the crew were killed in the initial explosion, but the remainder escaped. Cummins was rescued from a lifeboat some hours later by the destroyer HMS Boadicea. He then served as chief officer on the commandeered French liner SS Ile de France, which was converted into a troopship; its high speed enabled it to repeatedly ferry American troops across the Atlantic outside the convoy system.

Cummins returned to P&O after the Second World War, taking command of the liner RMS Maloja, which took Italian troops home to Italy, and soldiers of the King's African Rifles back to Africa. He then commanded the Liberty ship SS Samettrick and the SS Devanha on routes to Australia, the SS Somali to the Far East, and the SS Singapore and SS Socotra to Northern Europe. After commanding the SS Stratheden, he retired in 1960.

He became a Younger Brother of Trinity House in 1947, and was the Senior Younger Brother at his death. In retirement, he worked as a nautical assessor for the Wreck Commission of the Home Office. He also served as chairman of the planning committee of Marlborough Rural District Council from 1962 until 1974.

Until his death on 10 December 2006 at the age of 106, he lived in Great Bedwyn, Wiltshire.

He was survived by his wife Rosemary Cummins (née Byers) whom he married in Sydney in 1955 after meeting her on an earlier voyage from there; and their two sons and two daughters.
