= Conrad Patzig =

German navigator (1888–1975)

Conrad Patzig (24 May 1888 – 1 December 1975) was a German naval officer whose career spanned three navies and two world wars—from Imperial cadet through Japanese captivity to command of the Weimar and Nazi-era Kriegsmarine—and whose tenure as head of the Abwehr ended not in disgrace but in the quiet triumph of rivals he had made by openly opposing the SS. Patzig's previous opposition to the most notorious Nazi organization, paired with an unmatched command of the naval personnel system, made him indispensable later after 1945, when U.S. naval intelligence and, later, the fledgling Bundeswehr each turned to Patzig to vet West German officers.

== Family ==
He was born in Danzig, the son of Professor Victor Johann Patzig and his wife, Magdalene Marie Luise, née Stelter. He was the first cousin of German naval officer Helmut Brümmer-Patzig.

== Career ==
Patzig entered the Imperial Navy as a cadet on 3 April 1907, trained aboard the cruiser-frigate Stein, and was commissioned midshipman on 21 April 1908; posted to the dreadnought Nassau on 1 October 1909; he made sub-lieutenant there on 28 September 1910 and lieutenant on 27 September 1913. Three days later his sea service ended, and he joined a naval artillery unit at Kiautschou in China, serving as a company officer once he reached the leasehold.

The First World War's outbreak brought Patzig a fortress-battery command; the colony's capitulation on 8 November 1914 delivered him into Japanese captivity, where he was held until 22 January 1920. On the voyage home, Patzig was promoted to lieutenant-commander. On 30 January 1920, he was passed into the new Weimar republic's navy—first as an adjutant, then, from 8 April 1921 as a staff officer at Bremen. From 18 September 1922 to 14 September 1924 Patzig served as a navigation officer aboard the light cruiser Berlin; he moved next to the German navy's education inspectorate, making commander on 1 April 1926. He then spent a year commanding the Baltic training division's I Battalion at Kiel followed from 24 October 1927, then another as navigation officer aboard the battleship Schleswig-Holstein.

From 17 October 1929, Patzig served on the military intelligence staff at the Defense Ministry in Berlin, but later recalled that on taking up this post, he had had "no idea" about the workings of the Abwehr, and that he had subsequently "learned from the army men" ("bei den Heeresleuten gelernt")—testimony that reads as symptomatic of a Reichswehr that never integrated intelligence work into its General Staff training. Patzig was elevated to senior commander on 1 October 1931 and then department head of the Abwehr on 7 June 1932, despite the fact that he was a naval officer in an organization largely staffed by army personnel. For his exemplary organizational work, Patzig was promoted to captain on 1 October 1933 but was forced out of intelligence work on 2 January 1935, after having been transferred—presumably at the behest of Reinhard Heydrich and/or Heinrich Himmler—to the command of a ship. During the Nazi's ascendancy to power, Patzig had been an "outspoken" critic of the regime, especially of the SS. To that end, ardent Nazis considered him to be "politically unreliable." Patzig's ouster—ostensibly punishment for reconnaissance flights that threatened Hitler's fragile détente with Poland, but more plausibly the result of Himmler or Heydrich's pressure—cleared the way for Wilhelm Canaris to take over the Abwehr, Patzig's own handpicked successor.

Placed at the North Sea Naval Station commander's disposal, Patzig took command of the battleship Schleswig-Holstein on 28 February 1935, relinquished it that October to join the core crew of the pocket battleship Admiral Graf Spee and commanded her from commissioning until 1 October 1937—running security operations during the Spanish Civil War along the way.

During early October 1937, he was transferred to the Naval High Command as chief of its Personnel Office, and with it, promoted to Rear Admiral on 1 November, to Vice Admiral on 1 January 1940, and to Admiral on 1 April 1942. Placed at the navy commander-in-chief's disposal on 1 November 1942, Patzig was discharged from active service on 31 March 1943.

From 8 May 1945 to 15 March 1946, Patzig was held captive by the British; from August 1955 to November 1957 he sat, in an advisory capacity, on the committee vetting senior officers for the newly formed West German navy.

=== Cold War service to the United States ===
Following the Second World War, Patzig became a key intermediary between former Kriegsmarine personnel and U.S. naval intelligence. In 1949, amid rising alarm over Soviet intentions during the Berlin Blockade, Captain Arthur H. "Speed" Graubart, Chief of Naval Intelligence in Germany, and his assistant Edward R. Riedel recruited Patzig and Admiral Friedrich Ruge to organize the Naval Historical Team Bremerhaven (NHT). Patzig's detailed knowledge of the Kriegsmarine personnel system, combined with his record of opposition to National Socialism, made him well suited to draw veterans into the project. Under the outward guise of historical research, the team's work drew on Kriegsmarine wartime experience against the Soviet navy to address then current U.S. intelligence concerns.

Patzig's standing with the U.S. Navy and his continued credibility within the Kriegsmarine veterans' community led to a further role in 1955, when he was named the sole former Kriegsmarine officer on the independent personnel screening committee established under Theodor Blank to vet candidates for the newly forming Bundeswehr. The committee, approved by the Bundestag and representing multiple political parties, was tasked with ensuring that officers above the rank of colonel demonstrated unconditional commitment to democratic government, reflecting Bonn's determination to avoid a repetition of the civil-military failures of the Weimar Republic.

== Awards ==
- Iron Cross (1914), 2nd and 1st Class
- Colonial Badge
- War Merit Cross (1939), 2nd and 1st Class with Swords
- German Cross in Silver, 22 March 1943

== Bibliography ==
- Altenhöner, Florian (2015). "Augen und Ohren der Reichswehr: Der Geheime Meldedienst der Abwehr, 1919–1933". In Medrow, Lisa Anna; Münzner, Daniel; Radu, Robert G. (eds.). Kampf um Wissen: Spionage, Geheimhaltung und Öffentlichkeit, 1870–1940 (in German). Leiden: Brill Schöningh. pp. 194–213. doi:10.30965/9783657781447_012.
- Bassett, Richard (2011). Hitler's Spy Chief: The Wilhelm Canaris Betrayal. New York: Pegasus Books. ISBN 978-1-60598-450-6.
- Browder, George C. (1990). Foundations of the Nazi Police State: The Formation of Sipo and SD. The University Press of Kentucky. ISBN 978-0-81311-697-6.
- Krieger, Wolfgang (2018). "Germany: An Intelligence Community with a Fraught History". In de Graaff, Bob; Nyce, James M. (eds.). Handbook of European Intelligence Cultures. Bloomsbury Publishing. pp. 147–158. ISBN 978-1-78660-657-0.
- Peifer, Douglas Carl (2011). "Establishing the Bundesmarine: The Convergence of Central Planning and Pre-Existing Maritime Organizations, 1950–1956". In Corum, James S. (ed.). Rearming Germany. Leiden and Boston: Brill. pp. 117–144. ISBN 978-9-00420-317-4.
- Reichswehrministerium (1929). Rangliste der Deutschen Reichsmarine. Berlin: Mittler & Sohn.

=== Further reading ===
- Dermot, Bradley (ed.), Hans H. Hildebrand, Ernest Henriot: Deutschlands Admirale 1849–1945. Die militärischen Werdegänge der See-, Ingenieur-, Sanitäts-, Waffen- und Verwaltungsoffiziere im Admiralsrang. Band 3: P–Z. Biblio Verlag, Osnabrück 1990. ISBN 3-7648-1700-3. pp. 12–13.
- Lohmann, Walter, und Hans H. Hildebrand. Die Deutsche Kriegsmarine 1939–1945: Gliederung, Einsatz, Stellenbesetzung. Band III. Podzun Verlag, Bad Nauheim 1964. p. 268.
