= German hospital ship Ophelia =

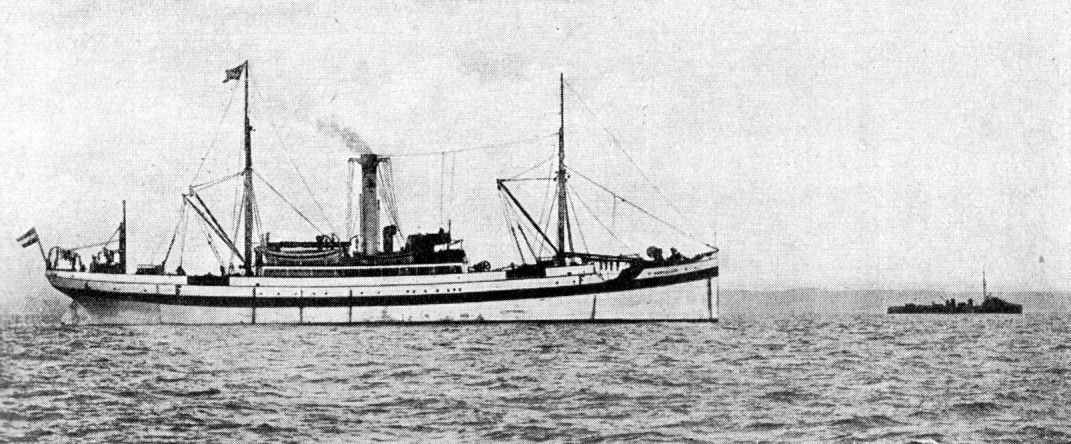
- SS Ophelia

History

German Empire
- Name: Ophelia
- Operator: Imperial German Navy
- Route: 1912–14 Hamburg London Linie; 1914 Imperial German Navy Hospital ship
- Builder: Flensburger Schiffsbau Gesellschaft
- Launched: 16 January 1912
- Completed: 1912
- Fate: Captured 17 October 1914

United Kingdom
- Name: Huntley
- Fate: Torpedoed and sunk 21 December 1915

General characteristics
- Tonnage: 1,153

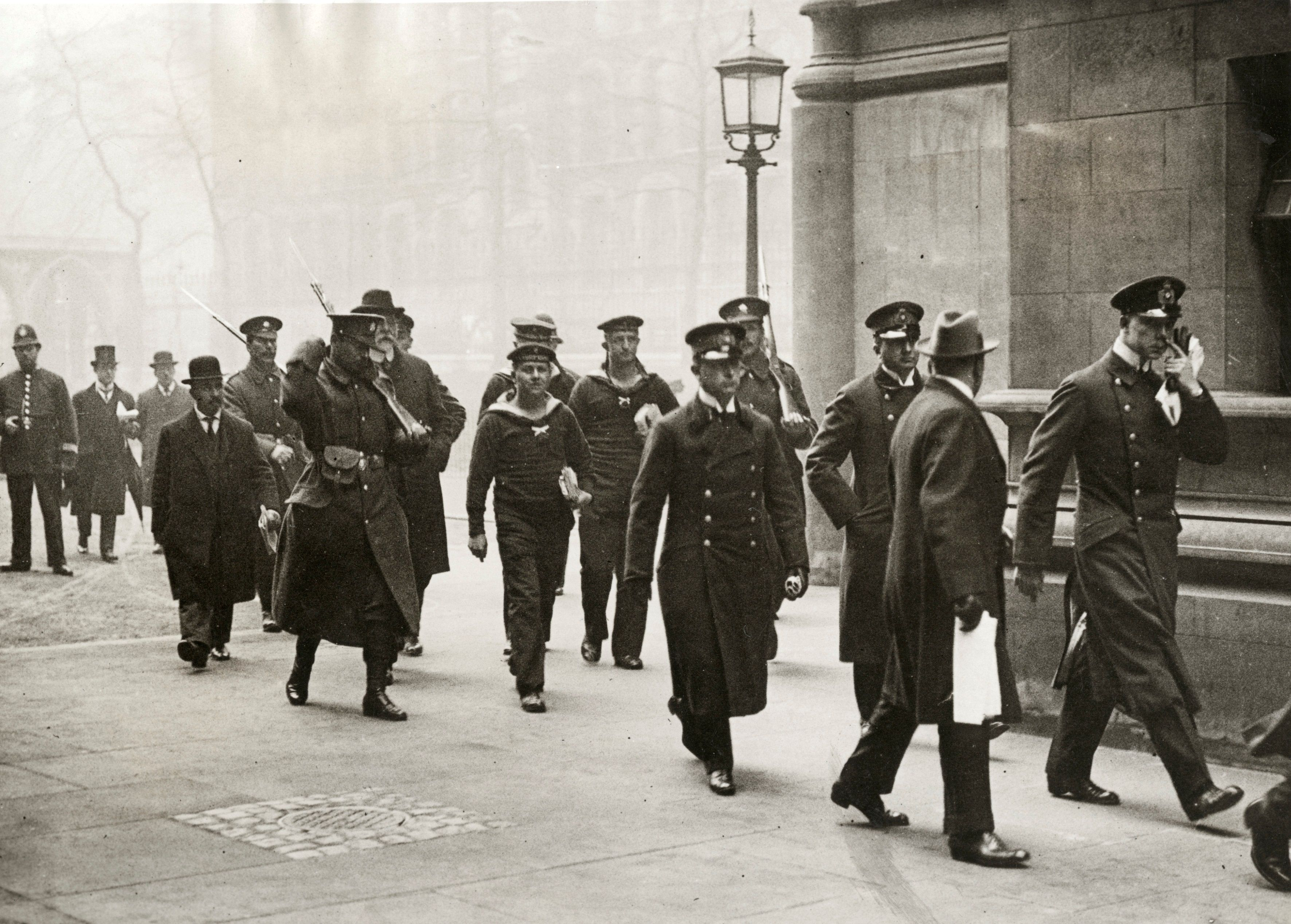
Crew of the Ophelia escorted through London on their way to court

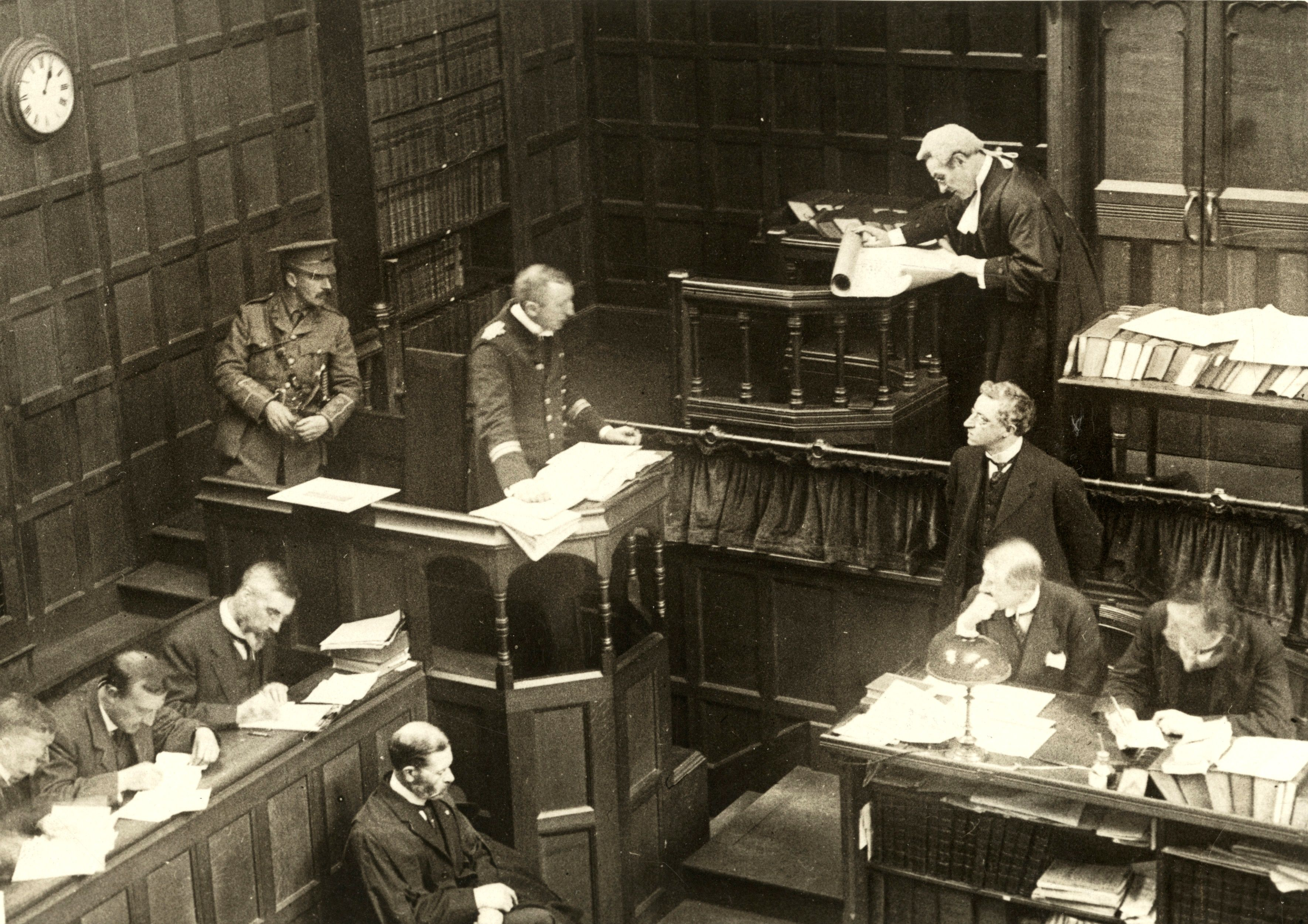
Pfeiffer at the British Prize Court

Ophelia was a steamship originally built by a German shipping company, but requisitioned for use as a hospital ship by the Imperial German Navy during the First World War. After being viewed acting suspiciously, the Ophelia was boarded on 17 October 1914 and seized by the Royal Navy for violating Hague Convention X of 1907 concerning hospital ships.

After her seizure, she operated in British service as SS Huntley until sunk in December 1915.

== Seizure ==
On 17 October 1914 a number of German torpedo boats were destroyed during the Battle off Texel by the British cruiser, HMS Undaunted, while laying naval mines off Haak lightship. German command sent out a hospital ship to search for survivors. Suspicions were aroused when British intelligence learned that Ophelia was using a wireless radio set, at that time unusual for a hospital ship, to communicate with the German wireless base at Norddeich station. In addition to using wireless radio she was using coded wireless transmissions; secret codes or their use are forbidden on hospital ships.

While in the area, British submarine, HMS D8, shadowed the German ship. When the Ophelia noticed the submarine she began to flee the area, further raising suspicions as her supposed task of searching for German survivors was not completed. Under Article 4 of Hague Convention X, hospital ships cannot be seized but they can be inspected by enemy craft.

HMS Meteor was sent to investigate the ship. As it approached for boarding and inspection it was observed that her commander, Dr. Pfeiffer, threw overboard a number of documents and secret codes.

== Reasons for seizure ==
The British Admiralty seized the Ophelia as a prize of war, rather than as a hospital ship. Their reasons for doubting her status as a hospital ship were the dumping of documents by the crew, the transmission of a coded message before the boarding, and the destruction of the ship's wireless set. Furthermore, the ship was not included in the list of hospital ships that were exchanged at the start of the war.

An enormous number of Verey lights were discovered on board. Fired from special pistols, Verey lights can be used as signal devices. The Ophelia had 600 green, 480 red and 140 white lights, and all records of how many she had before the seizure were destroyed before boarding. For comparison, a British hospital ship would stock about 12 lights of each colour.

== German response ==
The Imperial German Navy later used the seizure of Ophelia as part of the grounds, along with also accusing the Allies of illegally using hospital ships to transport healthy troops and war materiel, for their Admiralty's post-1917 authorisation to U-boats could fire upon Allied hospital ships under certain conditions:

On 17 October, 1914 ... we sent out the hospital ship Ophelia to pick up any survivors. However, the English captured her and made her prize, charging us with having sent her for scouting purposes, although she was obviously fitted up as a hospital ship and bore all the requisite markings...We also considered ourselves released from our obligations and with far more justification took action against hospital ships which, under cover of the Red Cross flag, were patently used for the transport of troops. — German Admiral Scheer

== Aftermath ==
The British renamed the ship SS Huntley and used her for transporting fuel from Portishead to Boulogne. On 21 December 1915 she was torpedoed and sunk by the German U-boat UB-10 .75 miles (1.21 km) off the Boulogne light vessel.

== See also ==
- List of hospital ships sunk in World War I
