= Rena McLean =

Canadian nurse (1879–1918)

Rena Maude McLean
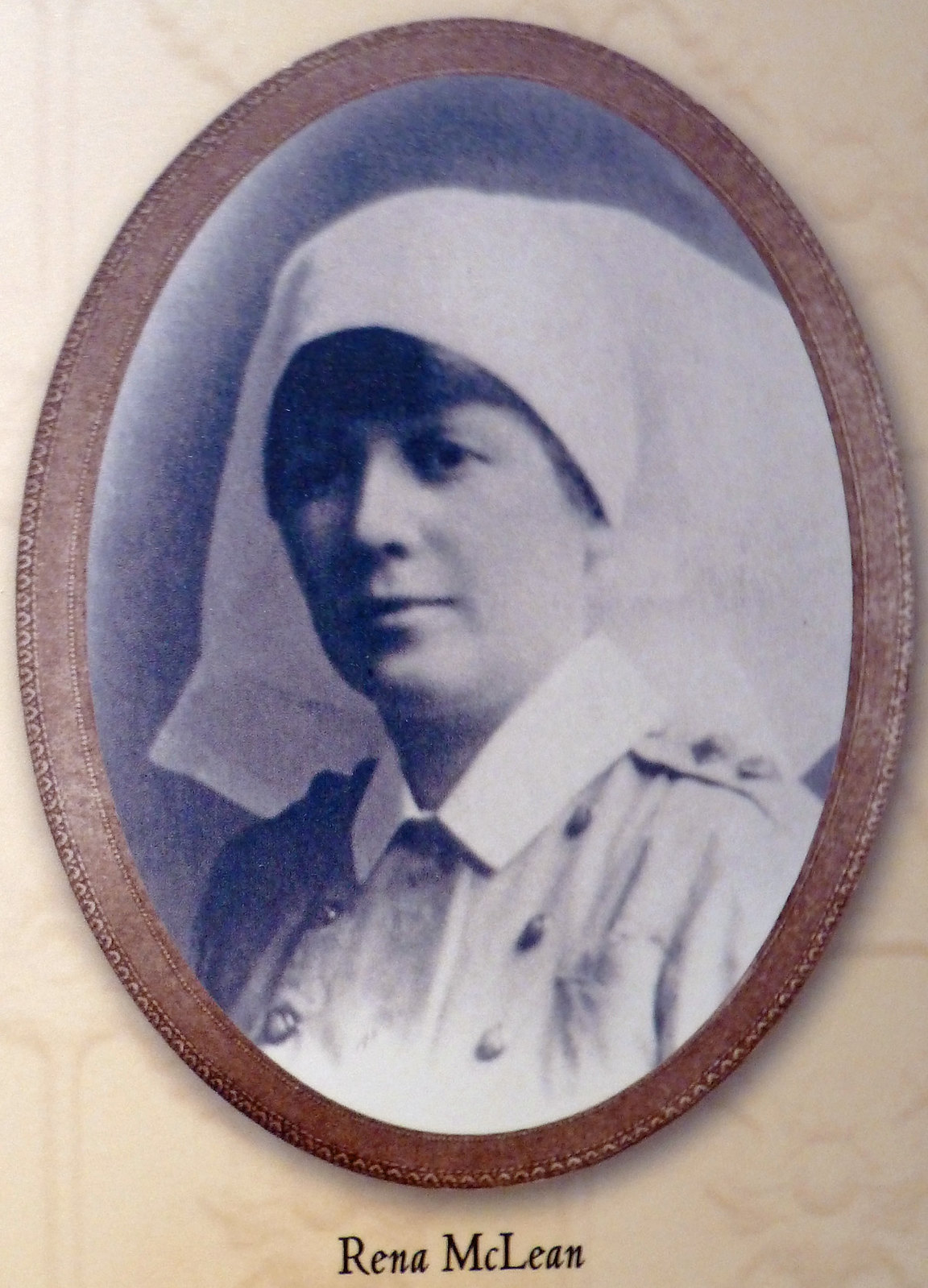
- Born: June 14, 1879; Souris, Prince Edward Island
- Died: June 27, 1918 (aged 39); At sea
- Occupation: nursing sister
- Known for: volunteer nurse

Rena Maude McLean (June 14, 1879 – June 27, 1918) was a Canadian nurse who volunteered during World War I. She helped set up the first hospital in France staffed exclusively by Canadians, and also served in the UK and Greece. She died when the Canadian hospital ship HMHS Llandovery Castle was torpedoed off the coast of Ireland.

== Early life and education ==
McLean was born in Souris on Prince Edward Island, Canada in 1879. Her parents were John McLean, a businessman and Conservative politician, and Matilda Jane McLean (née Jury). She studied at the Mount Allison Ladies' College in Sackville, New Brunswick, and the Halifax Ladies' College, graduating in 1896. McLean completed her training as a nurse in 1908 at Newport Hospital in Newport, Rhode Island, in the United States.

== Nursing career ==
At the outbreak of the war, McLean had been working as head nurse of the operating room at a hospital in Gardner, Massachusetts. She enlisted and was assigned to the Canadian Army Medical Corps on September 28, 1914, leaving soon after for Britain. By November 1914, she was in France. She was one of a group of Canadian nurses who converted a hotel into a hospital in Le Touquet. In 1915, 1,100 Canadian soldiers were treated there after they had been gassed.

She served in France, the UK and Greece. She died when the Canadian hospital ship HMHS Llandovery Castle was torpedoed off the south coast of Ireland. Even after the Llandovery Castle had sunk, the U boat continued to kill survivors in the water either by ramming their lifeboats or machine-gunning them.

== Legacy ==
A soldiers' hospital in Charlottetown was named for her in the year after her death, but it closed quite soon. There is a plaque in her memory at Charlottetown's Queen Elizabeth Hospital in their radiography department. Two other plaques recorded her life: one is at St James United Church in her home town and the other was in Mount Allison's Memorial Library, which was demolished in 2011.
