= HMHS Llandovery Castle =

Canadian hospital ship (sunk 1918)

Coordinates: 51°18′00″N 009°54′00″W

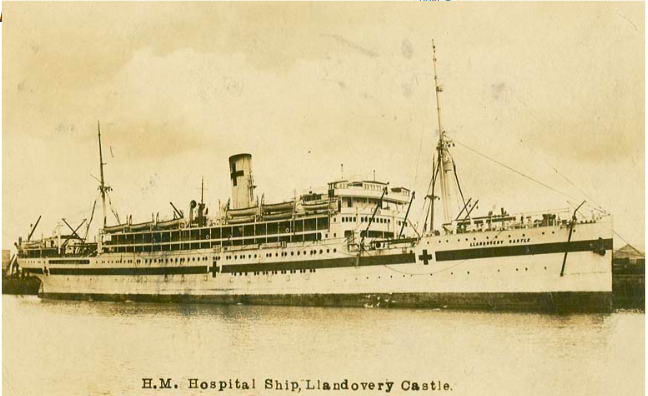
- HM Hospital Ship Llandovery Castle

History

United Kingdom
- Name: RMS Llandovery Castle
- Namesake: Llandovery Castle
- Operator: Union-Castle Line
- Builder: Barclay Curle, Glasgow
- Yard number: 504
- Launched: 3 September 1913
- Completed: January 1914
- Fate: Requisitioned, 1916

Canada
- Name: Llandovery Castle
- Commissioned: 26 July 1916
- Fate: Sunk by SM U-86, 27 June 1918

General characteristics
- Type: Ocean liner / Hospital ship
- Tonnage: 10,639 GRT
- Length: 500 ft 1 in (152.43 m)
- Beam: 63 ft 3 in (19.28 m)
- Propulsion: Quadruple expansion steam engines; 6,500 ihp (4,800 kW); Twin propellers
- Speed: 15 knots (28 km/h; 17 mph)
- Capacity: As ocean liner: 429 passengers (213 1st class, 116 2nd class, and 100 3rd class); As hospital ship: 622 beds and 102 medical staff
- Complement: 258

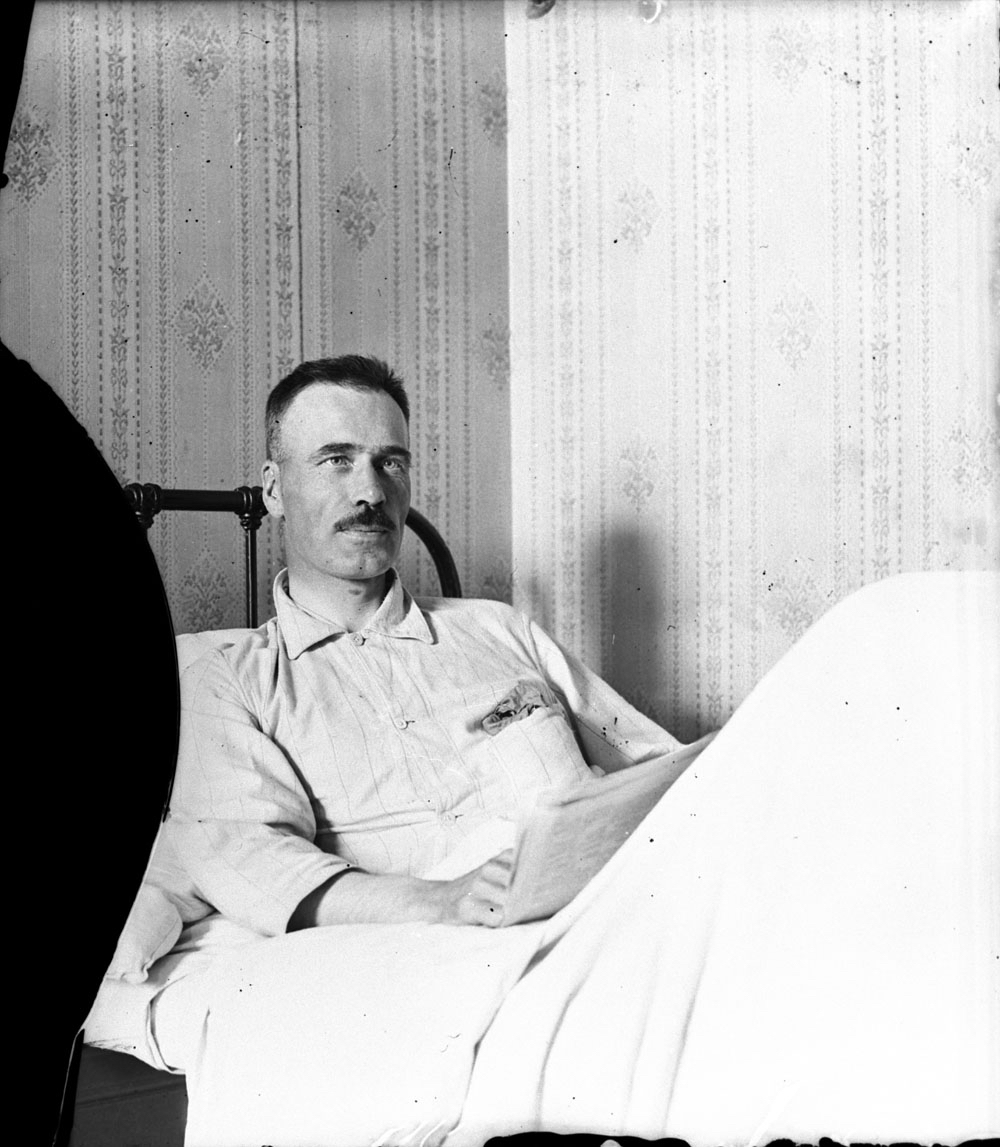
Major Thomas Lyon, surgeon with the Canadian Army Medical Corps, was a survivor of the Llandovery Castle bombing and massacre on June 27, 1918.

HMHS Llandovery Castle, built in 1914 in Glasgow as RMS Llandovery Castle for the Union-Castle Line, was one of five Canadian hospital ships that served in the First World War. On a voyage from Halifax, Nova Scotia to Liverpool, England, the ship was torpedoed off southern Ireland on 27 June 1918. The sinking was the deadliest Canadian naval disaster of the war. 234 doctors, nurses, members of the Canadian Army Medical Corps, soldiers and seamen died in the sinking and subsequent machine-gunning of lifeboats. Twenty five people are known to have survived. 24 were the occupants on a single life-raft. The incident became infamous internationally and was considered as one of the war's worst atrocities. After the war, the case of Llandovery Castle was one of six alleged German war crimes prosecuted at the Leipzig war crimes trials.

== Service history ==
Llandovery Castle was one of a pair of ships (her sister ship was SS Llanstephan Castle) built for the Union Castle Line, following the company's acquisition by the Royal Mail Line in 1912. The ship was built by Barclay, Curle & Co. in Glasgow, launched on 3 September 1913, and completed in January 1914. Initially sailing between London and East Africa, from August 1914 she sailed on routes between London and West Africa. She was commissioned as a hospital ship on 26 July 1916, and assigned to the Canadian Forces, equipped with 622 beds and a medical staff of 102. Her first voyage as a Canadian hospital ship was in March 1918.

=== Sinking ===
While under the command of Lieutenant Colonel Thomas Howard MacDonald of Nova Scotia, HMHS Llandovery Castle was torpedoed and sunk by the German submarine SM U-86 on 27 June 1918. Firing at a hospital ship was against international law and standing orders of the Imperial German Navy. The captain of U-86, Helmut Brümmer-Patzig, sought to destroy the evidence of torpedoing the ship. When the crew, including nurses, took to the lifeboats, U-86 surfaced, ran down all but one of the lifeboats and machine-gunned many of the survivors.

The destroyer HMS Lysander rescued 24 people in one lifeboat, 36 hours after the bombing. Among those lost were fourteen nursing sisters from Canada, including Rena McLean and the Matron Margaret Marjory (Pearl) Fraser, formerly of Nova Scotia.

Sergeant Arthur Knight was on board lifeboat #5 with the nurses. He reported:

Our boat was quickly loaded and lowered to the surface of the water. Then the crew of eight men and myself faced the difficulty of getting free from the ropes holding us to the ship's side. I broke two axes trying to cut ourselves away, but was unsuccessful.

With the forward motion and choppy sea the boat all the time was pounding against the ship's side. To save the boat we tried to keep ourselves away by using the oars, and soon every one of the latter were broken.

Finally the ropes became loose at the top and we commenced to drift away. We were carried towards the stern of the ship, when suddenly the poop-deck seemed to break away and sink. The suction drew us quickly into the vacuum, the boat tipped over sideways, and every occupant went under.

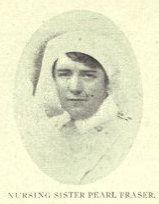
Matron Margaret Marjory (Pearl) Fraser (daughter of Lt. Governor of Nova Scotia Duncan Cameron Fraser).

I estimate we were together in the boat about eight minutes. In that whole time I did not hear a complaint or murmur from one of the sisters. There was not a cry for help or any outward evidence of fear. In the entire time I overheard only one remark when the matron, Nursing Sister M.M. Fraser, turned to me as we drifted helplessly towards the stern of the ship and asked: "Sergeant, do you think there is any hope for us?"

I replied, "No," seeing myself our helplessness without oars and the sinking condition of the stern of the ship.

A few seconds later we were drawn into the whirlpool of the submerged afterdeck, and the last I saw of the nursing sisters was as they were thrown over the side of the boat. All were wearing lifebelts, and of the fourteen two were in their nightdress, the others in uniform.

It was doubtful if any of them came to the surface again, although I myself sank and came up three times, finally clinging to a piece of wreckage and being eventually picked up by the captain's boat.

Afterward, HMS Morea steamed through the wreckage. Captain Kenneth Cummins, then an 18-yr old midshipman on his first voyage out, recalled the horror of coming across the nurses' floating corpses:

We were in the Bristol Channel, quite well out to sea, and suddenly we began going through corpses. The Germans had sunk a British hospital ship, the Llandovery Castle, and we were sailing through floating bodies. We were not allowed to stop - we just had to go straight through. It was quite horrific, and my reaction was to vomit over the edge. It was something we could never have imagined ... particularly the nurses: seeing these bodies of women and nurses, floating in the ocean, having been there some time. Huge aprons and skirts in billows, which looked almost like sails because they dried in the hot sun.

== War crimes trial ==
After the war, three officers from U-86, Kapitänleutnant Helmut Brümmer-Patzig, and Oberleutnants Ludwig Dithmar and John Boldt, were charged with committing a war crime on the high seas. On 21 July 1921, Dithmar and Boldt were found guilty in one of the Leipzig war crimes trials and were both sentenced to four years in prison. The sentences of Dithmar and Boldt were later overturned on the grounds that they were only following orders and that their commanding officer alone was responsible. Patzig, however, had fled to Danzig, then an independent city, and thus was never prosecuted as a result. Outside of Germany, the trials were seen as a travesty of justice because of the small number of cases tried and the perceived leniency of the court. According to American historian Alfred de Zayas, however, "generally speaking, the German population took exception to these trials, especially because the Allies were not similarly bringing their own soldiers to justice." (See Victor's justice.)

== Legacy ==
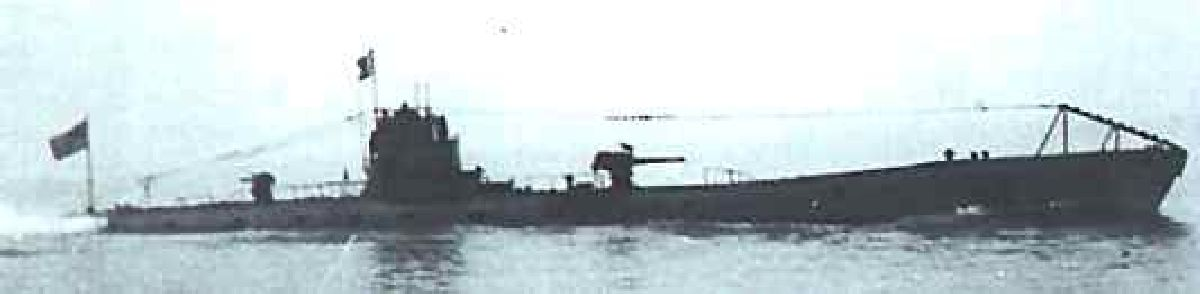
SM U-86

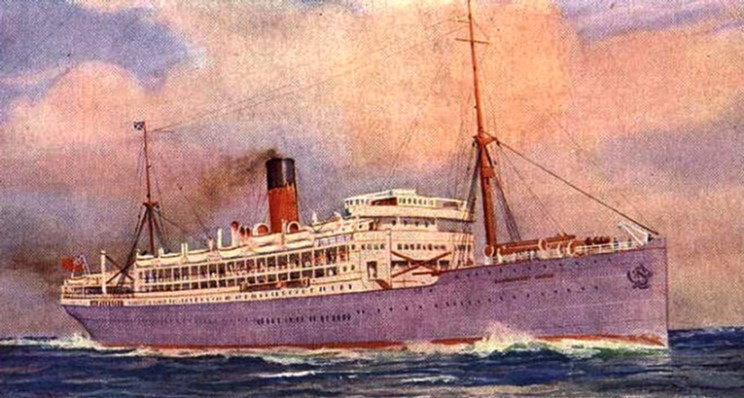
Postcard of Llandovery Castle

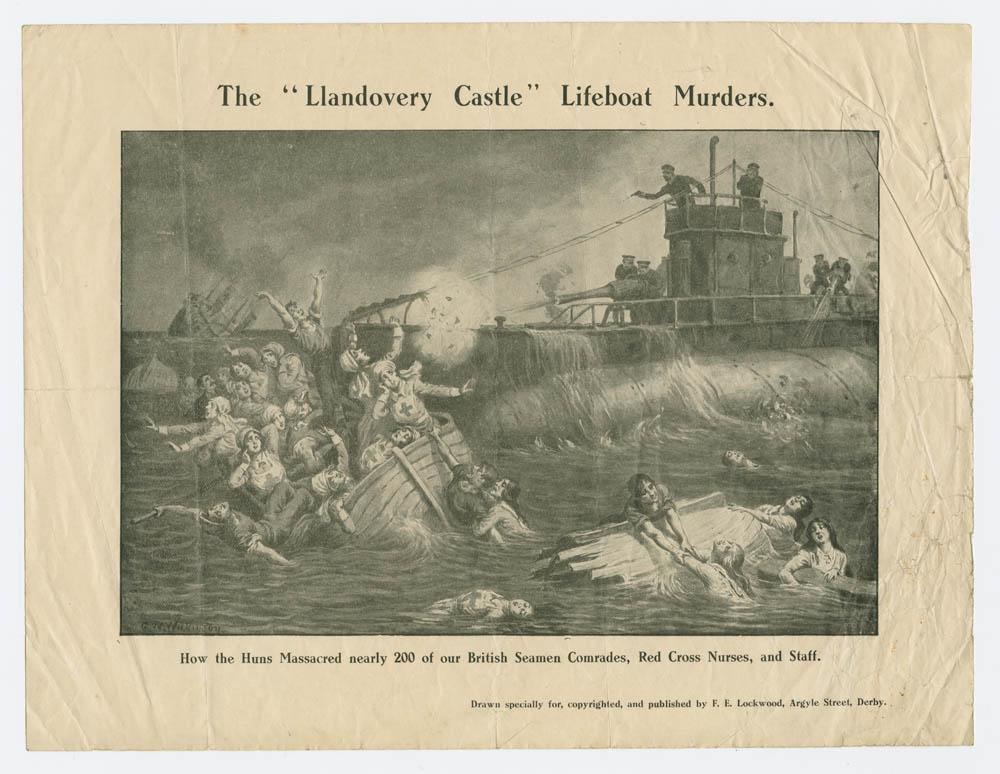
Llandovery Castle by George Wilkinson

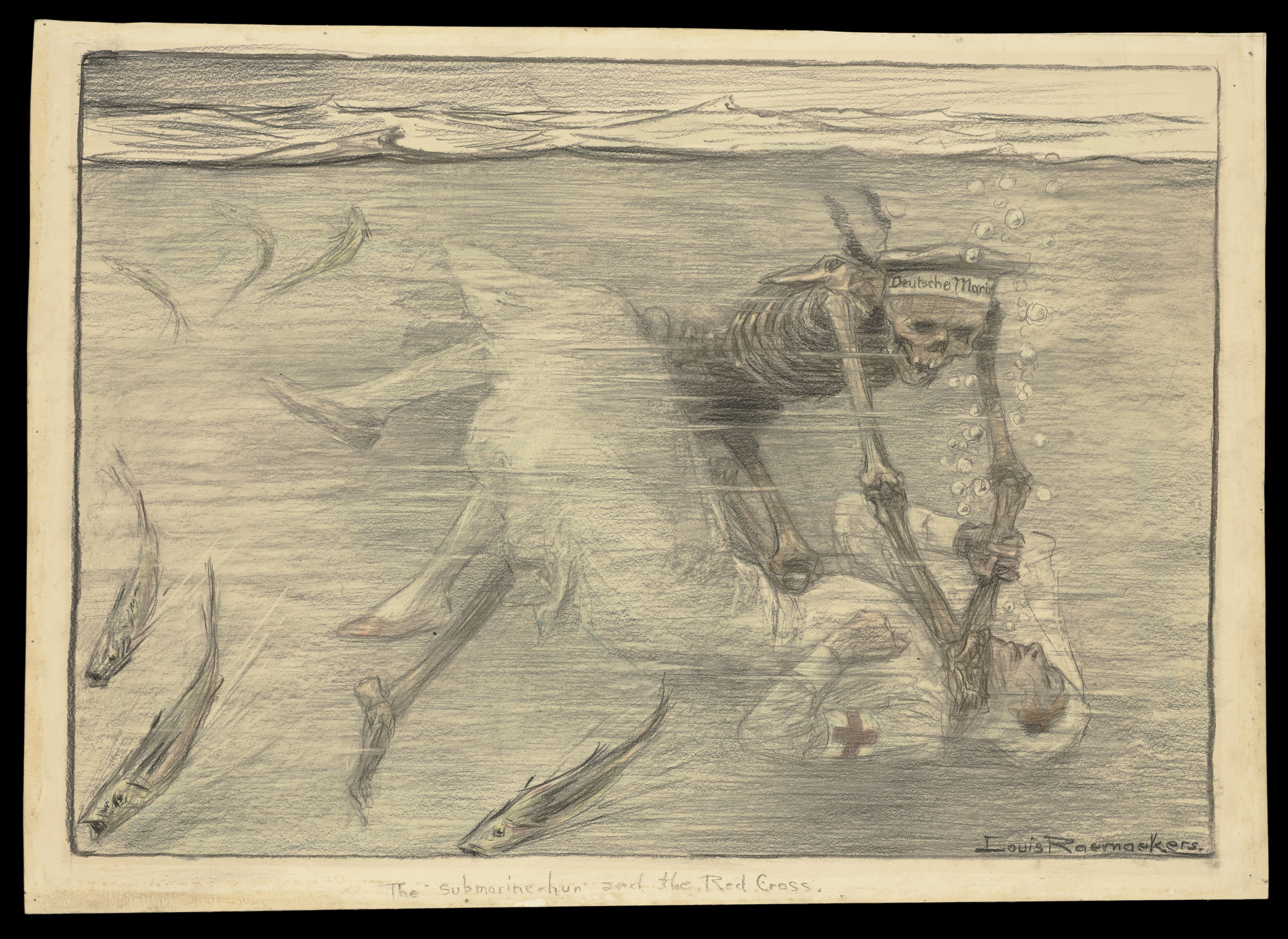
Anti German cartoon by Louis Raemaekers

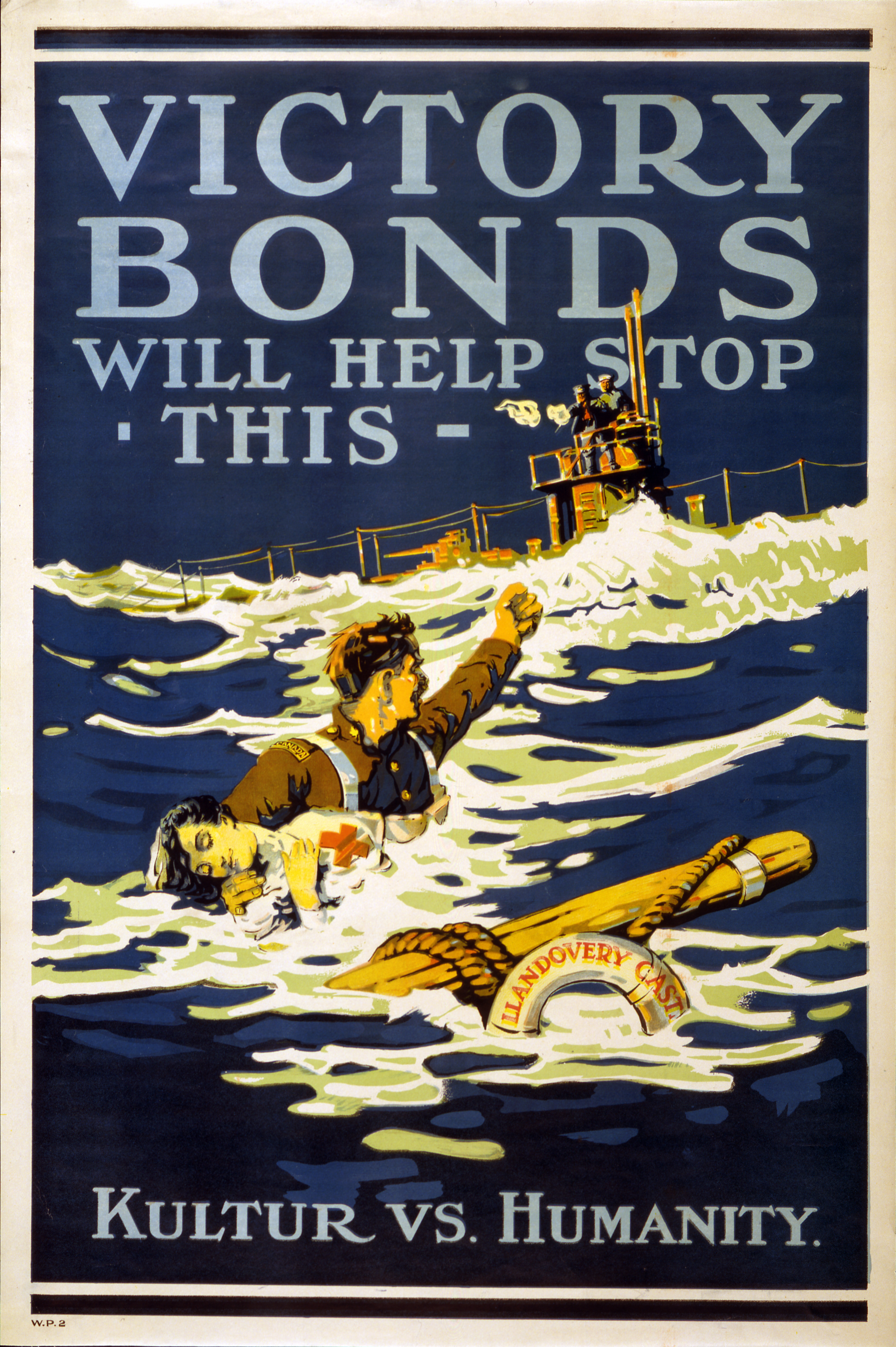
A 1918 Canadian propaganda poster used the sinking of Llandovery Castle as a focal point for selling Victory Bonds

The Canadian reaction was typified by Brigadier George Tuxford, former homesteader from Moose Jaw, Saskatchewan and commanding officer of the 3rd Infantry Brigade, 1st Canadian Division: "Amongst those murdered were two Moose Jaw nurses, Sister Fraser and Sister Gallagher. I gave instructions to the Brigade that the battle cry on the 8th of August should be "Llandovery Castle," and that that cry should be the last to ring in the ears of the Hun as the bayonet was driven home."

There is a memorial plaque to Matron Margaret Fraser and the 13 other Canadian nurses sponsored by Lady Dufferin was placed at the Nurses House of the Elizabeth Garrett Anderson Hospital in London, England.

There are also memorial plaques to the ship at the Stadacona Hospital, CFB Halifax, Nova Scotia, Montreal General Hospital and the Children's Hospital in Halifax, the latter two monuments unveiled by Margaret C. MacDonald.

An opera based on the sinking of the ship premiered in Toronto on the 100th anniversary of the sinking in June 2018. The opera is composed by Stephanie Martin with a libretto by Paul Ciufo, and according to one reviewer "breaks the story down into nine scenes set on the ship and, at the end, in the lifeboats, before the chorus steps out of time to reflect on what we have seen and heard."

== Casualties ==
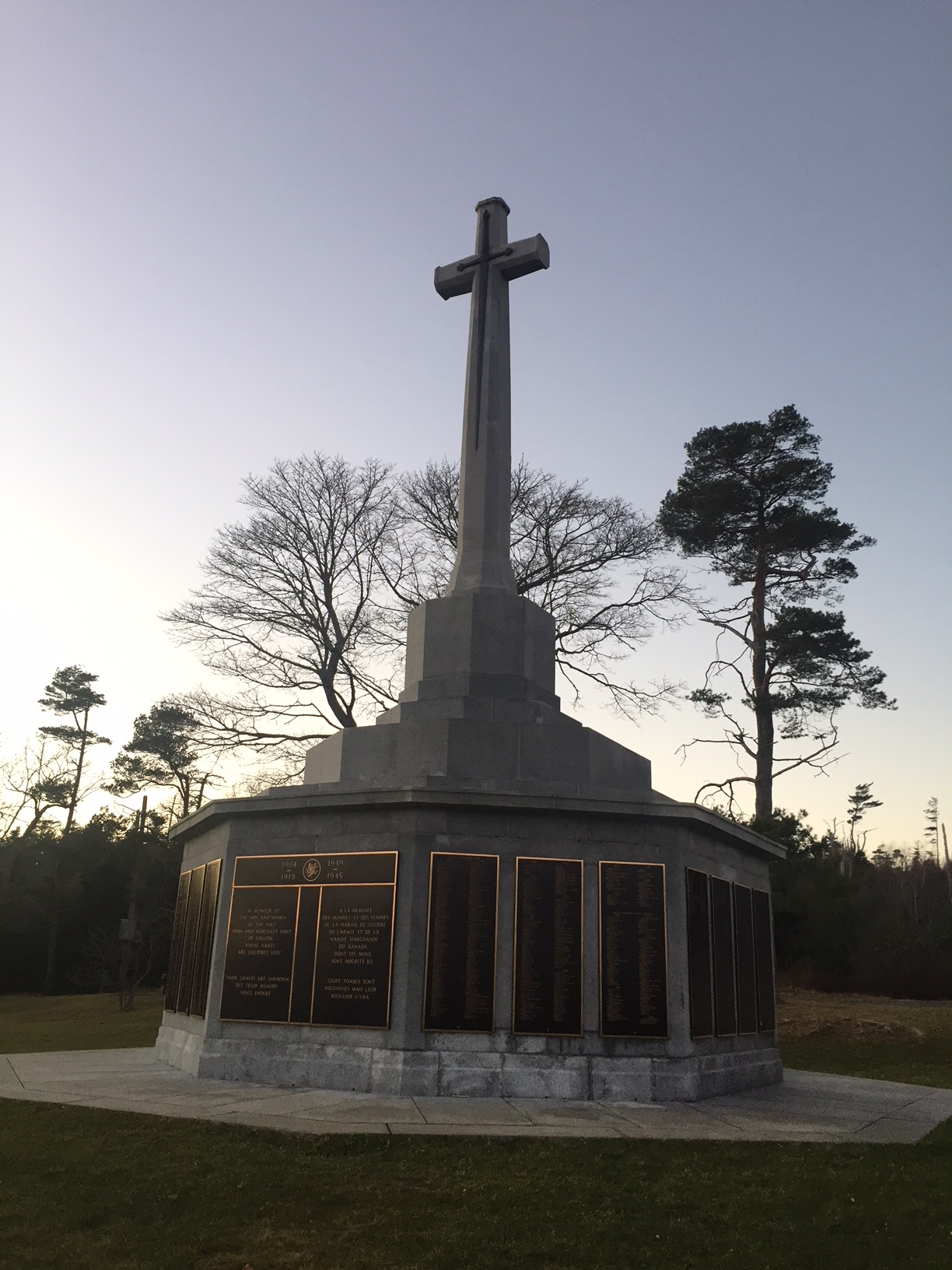
Nursing casualties are listed on the Halifax Memorial, Point Pleasant Park, Halifax, Nova Scotia

- Matron Margaret Marjory (Pearl) Fraser
- Carola Josephine Douglas.
- Alexina Dussault.
- Minnie Aenath Follette.
- Margaret Jane Fortescue.
- Minnie Katherine Gallaher.
- Jessie Mabel McDiarmid.
- Mary Agnes McKenzie.
- Christina Campbell.
- Rena McLean.
- Mary Belle Sampson.
- Gladys Irene Sare.
- Anna Irene Stamers.
- Jean Templeman.
- Benjamin Harold Turner.

== See also ==
- Atlantic U-boat Campaign (World War I)
- Military history of Nova Scotia
- List of maritime disasters
- Military history of Canada
- List of hospital ships sunk in World War I
- History of the Royal Canadian Navy
- Military history of Canada during World War I
