= Helmut Brümmer-Patzig =

German navy officer and world war I and II U-boat commander

- Born: 26 October 1890; Danzig, Kingdom of Prussia, German Empire
- Died: 11 March 1984 (aged 93); West Germany
- Military career
- Allegiance: German Empire; Weimar Republic; Nazi Germany
- Branch: Imperial German Navy; Reichsmarine; Kriegsmarine
- Service years: 1910–45
- Rank: Fregattenkapitän (frigate captain)
- Commands: SM U-86, January – August 1918; SM U-90, August – November 1918; UD-4, January – October 1941; 26th U-boat Flotilla, April 1943 – March 1945
- Conflicts: World War I World War II
- Awards: Iron Cross 1st Class War Merit Cross

Helmut Patzig, also known as Helmut Brümmer-Patzig (26 October 1890 – 11 March 1984) was a German U-boat commander in the Kaiserliche Marine in World War I, and the Kriegsmarine in World War II and war criminal. He was the first cousin of Admiral Conrad Patzig.

Patzig is best known as commander of U-86, the vessel that sank a Canadian hospital ship, HMHS Llandovery Castle, in 1918. Patzig evaded prosecution at the Leipzig War Crimes Trials in 1921 after fleeing German jurisdiction. During the Second World War he returned to naval service, serving as commander of the 26th U-boat Flotilla, a U-boat training group, from 1943 into 1945.

== Career ==
=== World War I ===
Patzig was born in the historic German port city of Danzig (now Gdańsk) in 1890, and, as Helmut Patzig, joined the German Navy as a 19-year-old cadet in April 1910. At first assigned to surface ships, the young seaman switched to U-boat service in November 1915, by which time World War I had begun. As a submarine watch officer, Patzig was awarded the Iron Cross – First Class in March 1917. He was assigned to his first sea command, the U-boat U-86, in January 1918.

Under Patzig, the U-86 was assigned to patrol the Western Approaches to the British Isles during a pivot-point in the war. By 1918, the Kaiser's fleet of U-boats had acquired sufficient strength to be able to sight, and sink, a substantial percentage of the ships that attempted to deliver necessary supplies to Great Britain. Germany had declared unrestricted submarine warfare against Great Britain, which in its eyes gave it the right to "sink on sight" ships bound to or from the enemy nation. As commander, Patzig was responsible for the sinking of twenty-four enemy vessels totaling 89,318 gross register tons (GRT).

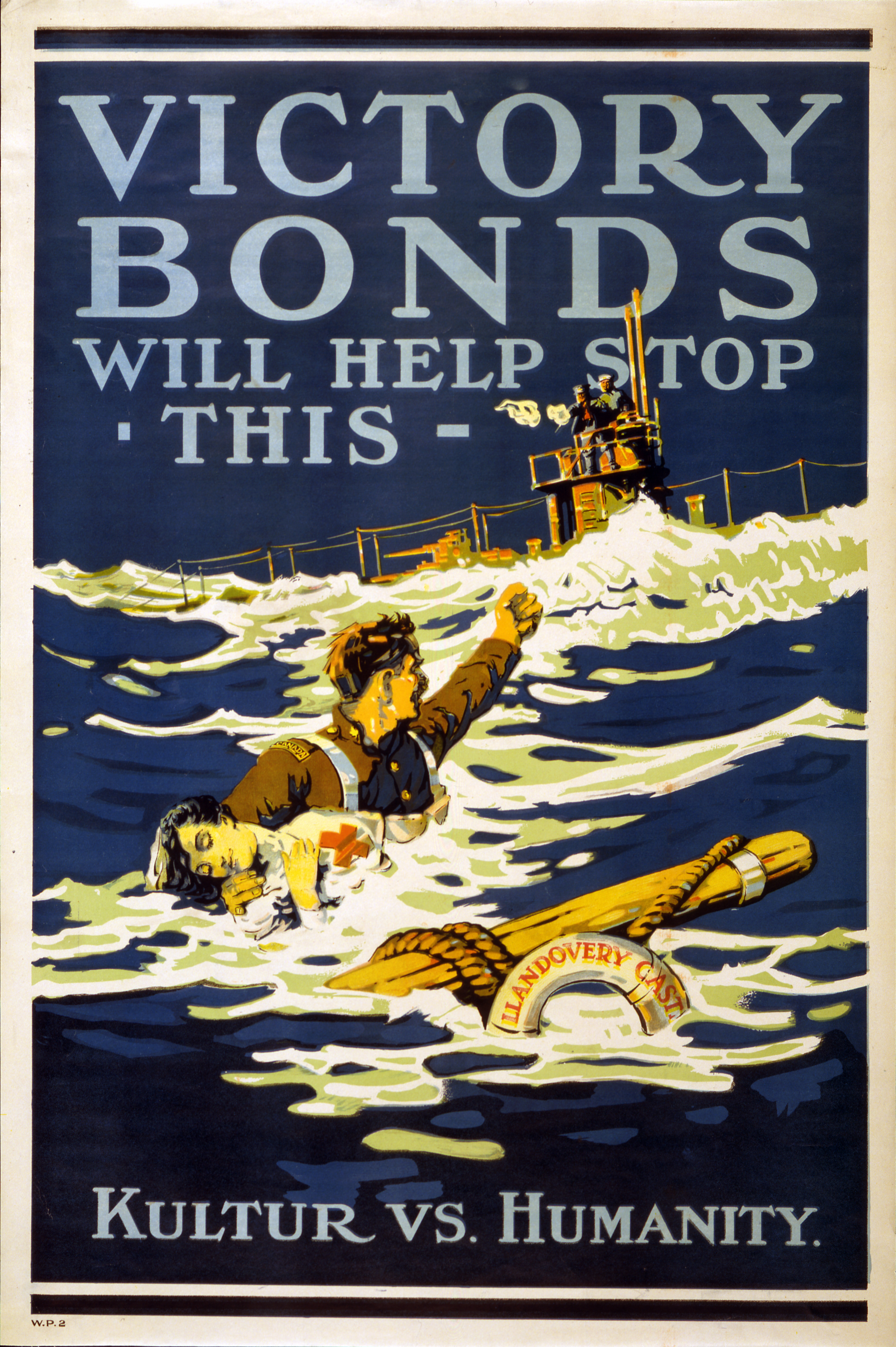
After Brümmer-Patzig's U-86 sank the Llandovery Castle, Canadian propagandists published this poster.

On 27 June 1918, the U-86 sighted a Canadian hospital ship, HMHS Llandovery Castle, off the southern coast of Ireland. The Llandovery Castle, a former liner of the Union Castle Line, had been requisitioned and converted into a hospital ship. In compliance with the laws of war accepted by all of the European combatant nations – including Germany – at that time, the Llandovery Castle had been marked with painted and lighted Red Crosses to signify its status as a noncombatant vessel. Despite these markings the U-86, under Patzig's command, successfully torpedoed the Llandovery Castle. The sinking hospital ship put out lifeboats, but only one lifeboat and its 24 passengers survived. Multiple witnesses from the survivors reported that the submarine had surfaced and then, under Patzig's command, systematically rammed and sank other lifeboats, and then machine-gunned survivors in the water. This was confirmed in the war crimes trial that followed in Germany after the war, where Patzig's subordinates were found guilty. 234 persons aboard the Llandovery Castle were murdered.

This story told by Llandovery Castle survivors was extensively publicized as World War I propaganda throughout the United Kingdom, Canada, and the U.S.A. during the remaining months of the war. The victorious Allies believed Patzig was a war criminal, but left the task of prosecution to the former commander's fellow citizens. By returning, in 1921, to his place of birth in the Free City of Danzig, Brümmer-Patzig evaded the jurisdiction of the German courts, and pre-empted court proceedings against him. The indictment against Patzig was quashed in absentia in 1931 as an acknowledgment by the German courts of the enactment, by the Reichstag, of two laws of amnesty that applied to his case. Thus, no testimony was taken in a court of law to set forth Patzig's point of view on the atrocity.

=== World War II ===
In World War II Patzig, now under the name Brümmer-Patzig, again saw service in the German navy's U-boat arm. The terms of Part V of the Treaty of Versailles had forced Germany to scuttle its submarine fleet at the end of the war, but when Adolf Hitler came to power in 1933, he swiftly bypassed the Treaty and ordered the Kriegsmarine to rebuild its U-boat arm. This created a career opportunity for men like Brümmer-Patzig who had been comparatively young submarine commanders during the first war.

When war broke out in 1939, Brümmer-Patzig accepted a series of postings, of increasing levels of responsibility, in Germany, occupied France, and the occupied Netherlands. As a middle-aged sea officer, Brümmer-Patzig was not expected to take on a sea command as he had in the first war; he was ordered to specialise in instruction, training, and sea trial duties. However, from January to October 1941, he was nominally in command of UD-4, a captured Dutch submarine. From November 1941 until March 1943, he served as a torpedo attack instructor in the 25th U-boat Flotilla, a training group based in the Baltic Sea. In April 1943 he was assigned to command the 26th U-boat Flotilla, another Baltic Sea flotilla of submariners-in-training. In conjunction with these increased duties, he was promoted from Korvettenkapitän (Lieutenant Commander) to Fregattenkapitän (Commander). Brümmer-Patzig commanded the 26th Flotilla until March 1945, by which time the war was within weeks of its end.

Brümmer-Patzig's final appearance on the rolls of the Kriegsmarine is his discharge from service on 3 May 1945, four days before the signing of the German surrender on 7 May.

He died on 11 March 1984.

== Decorations and awards ==
- Knights Cross of the House Order of Hohenzollern with Swords (11 July 1918)
- Iron Cross of 1914,
  - 2nd class (11 May 1916)
  - 1st class (6 March 1917)
- Iron Cross of 1939, 2nd class (1 September 1940)
- War Merit Cross, 2nd class with swords (20 April 1943)

== Bibliography ==
- Busch, Rainer; Röll, Hans-Joachim (1999). German U-boat commanders of World War II : a biographical dictionary. Translated by Brooks, Geoffrey. London, Annapolis, Md: Greenhill Books, Naval Institute Press. ISBN 1-55750-186-6.
