= SS Tirol =

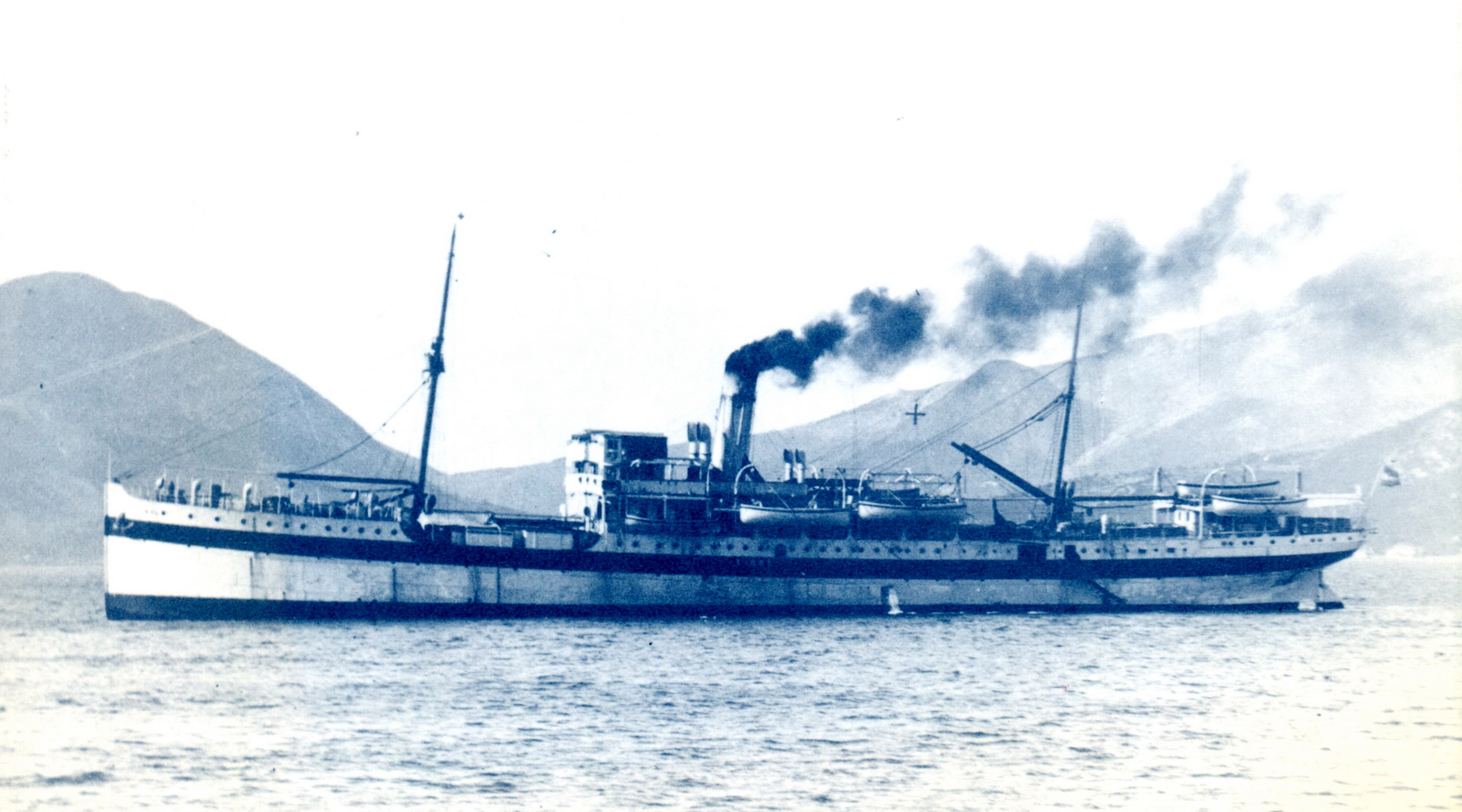
- Tirol in the First World War.

History
- Name: Tirol (1901–1918); Trento (1921–1929)
- Namesake: 1901: Tirol; 1921: Trento
- Owner: Lloyd Austriaco, Lloyd Triestino
- Operator: 1916: (Austria-Hungary) Austro-Hungarian Navy
- Port of registry: 1901: (Austria-Hungary) Trieste; 1921: (Kingdom of Italy) Trieste
- Launched: 28 September 1901
- Completed: 5 January 1902
- Fate: Scrapped, 1929

General characteristics
- Type: Hospital ship
- Tonnage: 2,836 GRT

SS Tirol was an Austro-Hungarian hospital ship that was mined in the Adriatic Sea off Durazzo on 16 April 1916 but was salvaged and returned to service later that year. The ship was scrapped sometime in 1929 after being handed over to Italy.

== Construction ==
Tirol was launched on 28 September 1901 and completed on 5 January 1902 as a passenger ship for Lloyd Austriaco. The ship was assessed at 2,836 GRT.

== World War I ==
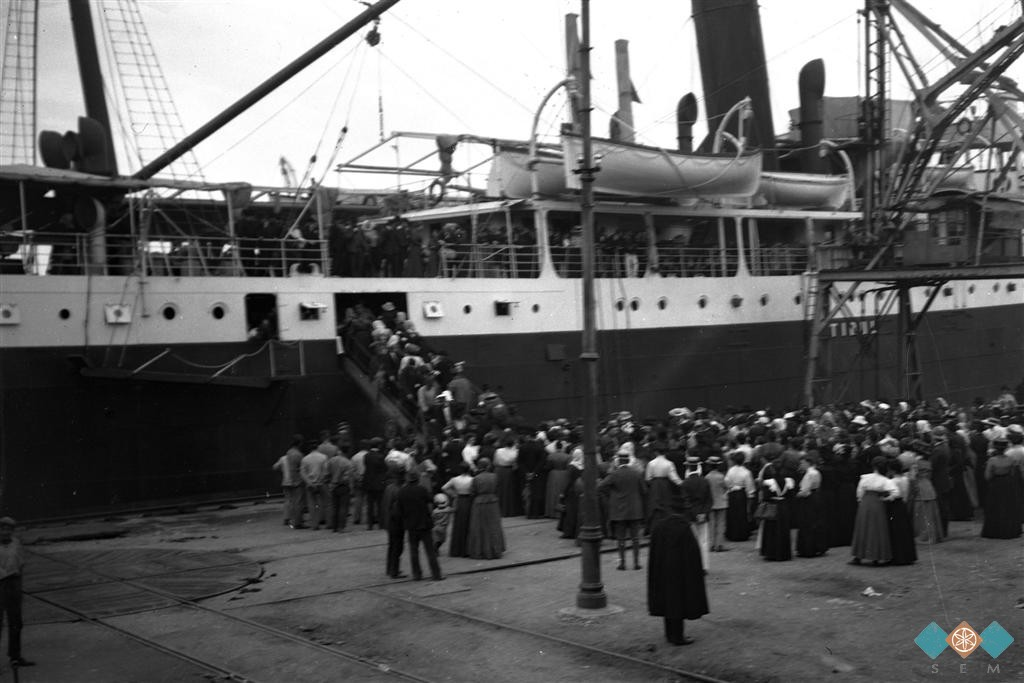
Tirol as a passenger ship in 1910.

Tirol was briefly used by the Austro-Hungarian Navy as a hospital ship between 17 August to 24 December 1914, before being returned to her previous owner. It was only when the Austro-Hungarian Army booked more success on their front of the World War I with the invasion of Montenegro and advances on the retreating Serbian Army on the Albanian coast, that the hospital ships were reintroduced to service including Tirol. The ship returned to service on 4 January 1916 after being refitted at Fiume, sailing the Adriatic Sea.

Despite her use as a hospital ship, Tirol came within close borders of becoming a casualty of war when on 16 April 1916, she hit a mine off Durazzo resulting in the deaths of 40 onboard. But before she could sink, another ship from the same company as her managed to tow her to the Austro-Hungarian naval base at Pula for repairs. She returned to service on 7 October 1916 and didn't experience any further incidents during the remainder of the war.

== End ==
In 1919 Tirol was transferred to Lloyd Triestino as a possible war repayment to Italy which Austria-Hungary fought against during the war. She returned to normal civil service and was renamed Trento in 1921. She was scrapped in 1929.
