= SM U-86 =

German submarine during World War I

Coordinates: 50°0′26.628″N 0°0′33.954″W

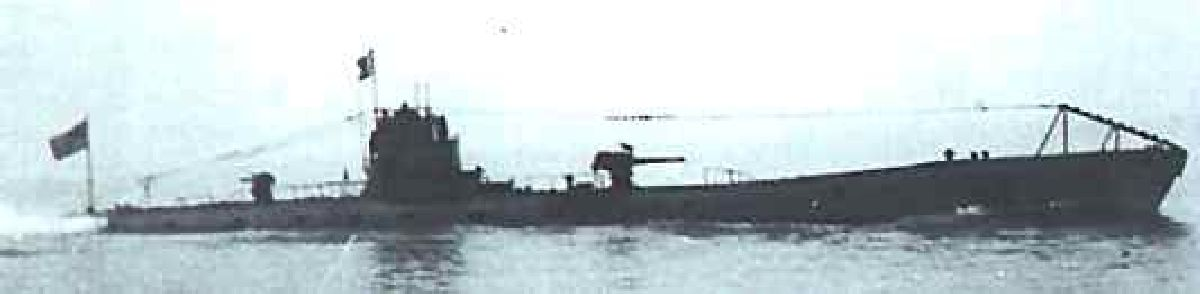

History

German Empire
- Name: U-86
- Ordered: 23 June 1915
- Builder: Germaniawerft, Kiel
- Yard number: 256
- Laid down: 5 November 1915
- Launched: 7 November 1916
- Commissioned: 30 November 1916
- Fate: Surrendered 20 November 1918; scuttled in the English Channel 1921.

General characteristics
- Displacement: 808 t (795 long tons) surfaced; 946 t (931 long tons) submerged
- Length: 70.06 m (229 ft 10 in) (o/a); 55.55 m (182 ft 3 in) (pressure hull)
- Beam: 6.30 m (20 ft 8 in) (oa); 4.15 m (13 ft 7 in) (pressure hull)
- Height: 8.00 m (26 ft 3 in)
- Draught: 4.02 m (13 ft 2 in)
- Installed power: 2 × 2,400 PS (1,765 kW; 2,367 shp) surfaced; 2 × 1,200 PS (883 kW; 1,184 shp) submerged
- Propulsion: 2 shafts; 2 × 1.70 m (5 ft 7 in) propellers
- Speed: 16.8 knots (31.1 km/h; 19.3 mph) surfaced; 9.1 knots (16.9 km/h; 10.5 mph) submerged
- Range: 11,220 nmi (20,780 km; 12,910 mi) at 8 knots (15 km/h; 9.2 mph) surfaced; 56 nmi (104 km; 64 mi) at 5 knots (9.3 km/h; 5.8 mph) submerged
- Test depth: 50 m (164 ft 1 in)
- Complement: 4 officers, 31 enlisted
- Armament: 4 × 50 cm (19.7 in) torpedo tubes (two bow, two stern); 12-16 torpedoes; 1 × 10.5 cm (4.1 in) SK L/45 deck gun (from 1917)

Service record
- Part of: IV Flotilla; 21 February 1917 – 11 November 1918
- Commanders: Kptlt. Friedrich Crüsemann; 30 November 1916 – 22 June 1917; Kptlt. Alfred Götze; 23 June 1917 – 25 January 1918; Oblt.z.S. Helmut Patzig; 26 January – 11 November 1918
- Operations: 12 patrols
- Victories: 31 merchant ships sunk (89,821 GRT); 2 auxiliary warships sunk (27,762 GRT); 1 auxiliary warship damaged (163 GRT)

SM U-86 was a Type U 81 submarine manufactured in the Germaniawerft, Kiel shipyard for the German Empire during World War I.

On 27 June 1918, under the command of Lieutenant Helmut Patzig, U-86 sank the Canadian hospital ship HMHS Llandovery Castle off the coast of Ireland, in violation of international law and standing orders of the Imperial German Navy. When the crew took to the lifeboats, U-86 surfaced, ran down all the lifeboats except one, and shot at the people in the water. Only the 24 people in the remaining lifeboat survived. They were rescued shortly afterwards and testified as to what had happened. The 234 others on board Llandovery Castle were lost, including fourteen nursing sisters.

USS Covington, the former Hamburg America ocean liner SS Cincinnati, was torpedoed by U-86 on 1 July 1918 and sank the next day. Covington was the 17th largest ship sunk or damaged by U-boats during the war.

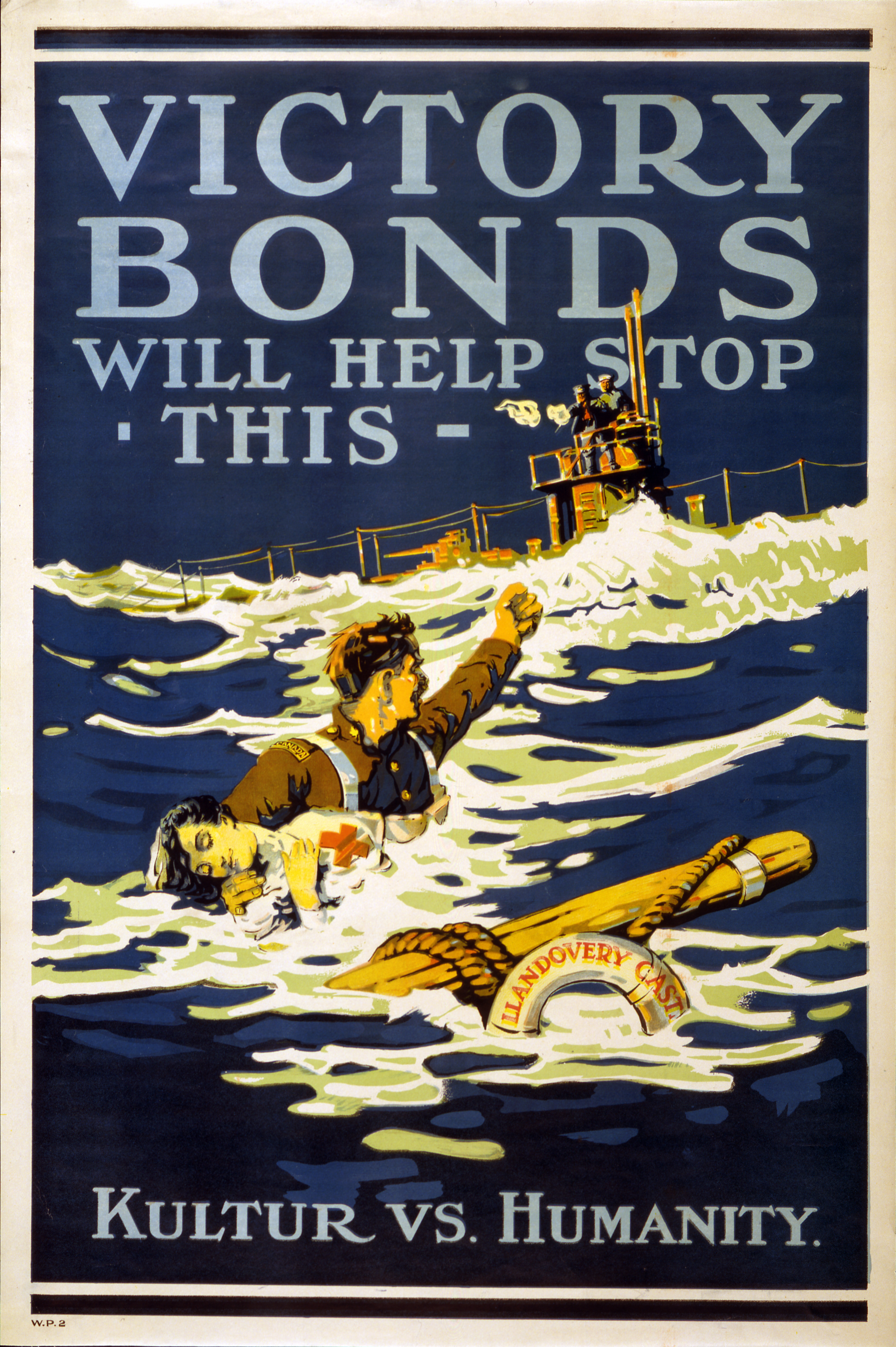
A 1918 Canadian propaganda poster used U-86's sinking of Llandovery Castle as a focal point for selling Victory Bonds.

After the war, the captain of U-86 Helmut Patzig, and two of his lieutenants were arraigned for trial on war crimes, but Patzig fled to the Free City of Danzig, and his trial was stopped on 20 March 1931 by virtue of the Laws of Amnesty. Lieutenants Ludwig Dithmar and Johan Boldt were convicted and sentenced to four years in prison; they were released after four months.

== Design ==
Type U 81 submarines were preceded by the shorter Type UE I submarines. U-86 had a displacement of 808 tonnes (795 long tons) when at the surface and 946 tonnes (931 long tons) while submerged. She had a total length of 70.06 m (229 ft 10 in), a pressure hull length of 55.55 m (182 ft 3 in), a beam of 6.30 m (20 ft 8 in), a height of 8 m (26 ft 3 in), and a draught of 4.02 m (13 ft 2 in). The submarine was powered by two 2,400 metric horsepower (1,800 kW; 2,400 shp) engines for use while surfaced, and two 1,200 metric horsepower (880 kW; 1,200 shp) engines for use while submerged. She had two propeller shafts. She was capable of operating at depths of up to 50 metres (160 ft).

The submarine had a maximum surface speed of 16.8 knots (31.1 km/h; 19.3 mph) and a maximum submerged speed of 9.1 knots (16.9 km/h; 10.5 mph). When submerged, she could operate for 56 nautical miles (104 km; 64 mi) at 5 knots (9.3 km/h; 5.8 mph); when surfaced, she could travel 11,220 nautical miles (20,780 km; 12,910 mi) at 8 knots (15 km/h; 9.2 mph). U-86 was fitted with six 50 centimetres (20 in) torpedo tubes (four at the bow and two at the stern), twelve to sixteen torpedoes, and one 10.5 cm (4.1 in) SK L/45 deck gun (from 1917). She had a complement of thirty-five (thirty-one crew members and four officers).

== Fate ==
U-86 was surrendered to the Allies at Harwich on 21 November 1918 in accordance with the requirements of the Armistice with Germany. Exhibited at Bristol in December 1918, along with UC-92, visitors could pay to go on board with proceeds going to charity. She was then laid up at Portsmouth until scuttled in the English Channel on 30 June 1921.

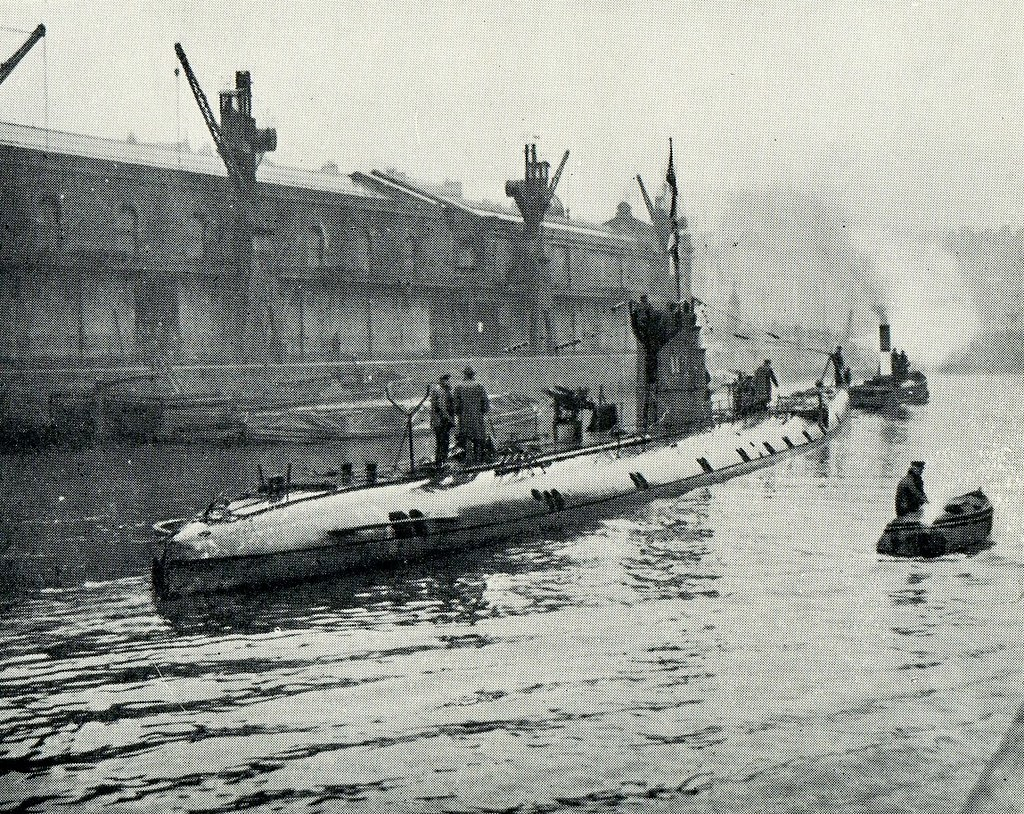
U86 being brought into Bristol Floating Harbour for exhibition at the end of the war. The background shows what is now M-Shed museum.

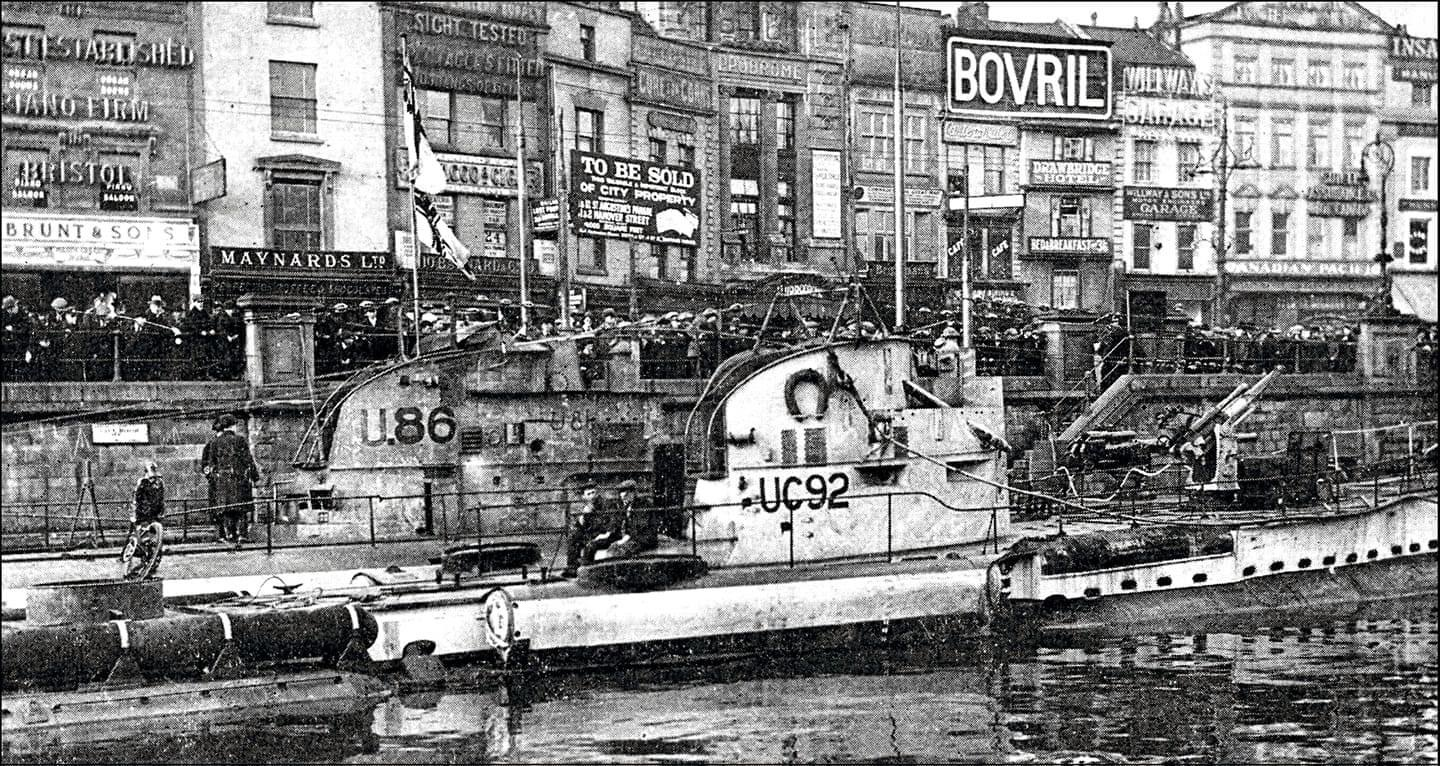
Uboats U-86 and UC-92 on exhibition in Bristol at the end of the war. Bristol Hippodrome can be seen in the background.

== Summary of raiding history ==
| Date | Name | Nationality | Tonnage (Note: Merchant ship tonnages are in gross register tons. Military vessels are listed by tons displacement.) | Fate |
|---|---|---|---|---|
| 23 March 1917 | Queenborough | United Kingdom | 165 | Sunk |
| 5 April 1917 | Dunkerquoise | France | 127 | Sunk |
| 5 April 1917 | Marie Celine | France | 142 | Sunk |
| 5 April 1917 | Siberier | Belgium | 2,968 | Sunk |
| 6 April 1917 | Rosalind | United Kingdom | 6,535 | Sunk |
| 18 April 1917 | Atalanta | Sweden | 1,091 | Sunk |
| 28 May 1917 | Antinoe | United Kingdom | 2,396 | Sunk |
| 28 May 1917 | Limerick | United Kingdom | 6,827 | Sunk |
| 29 May 1917 | Oswego | United Kingdom | 5,793 | Sunk |
| 31 May 1917 | N. Hadzikyriakos | Greece | 3,533 | Sunk |
| 2 July 1917 | Bessie | Sweden | 66 | Sunk |
| 10 August 1917 | Capella I | Norway | 3,990 | Sunk |
| 13 August 1917 | Turakina | United Kingdom | 9,920 | Sunk |
| 15 December 1917 | Baron Leopold Davilliers | French Navy | 163 | Damaged |
| 20 December 1917 | Polvarth | United Kingdom | 3,146 | Sunk |
| 14 February 1918 | Bessie Stephens | United Kingdom | 119 | Sunk |
| 17 February 1918 | Pinewood | United Kingdom | 2,219 | Sunk |
| 19 February 1918 | Wheatflower | United Kingdom | 188 | Sunk |
| 20 February 1918 | Djerv | United Kingdom | 1,527 | Sunk |
| 23 February 1918 | Ulabrand | Norway | 2,011 | Sunk |
| 30 April 1918 | Kafue | United Kingdom | 6,044 | Sunk |
| 30 April 1918 | Kempock | United Kingdom | 255 | Sunk |
| 2 May 1918 | Medora | United Kingdom | 5,135 | Sunk |
| 5 May 1918 | Tommi | United Kingdom | 138 | Sunk |
| 6 May 1918 | Leeds City | United Kingdom | 4,298 | Sunk |
| 11 May 1918 | San Andres | Norway | 1,656 | Sunk |
| 12 May 1918 | Inniscarra | United Kingdom | 1,412 | Sunk |
| 16 May 1918 | Tartary | United Kingdom | 4,181 | Sunk |
| 22 May 1918 | Meran | Norway | 656 | Sunk |
| 21 June 1918 | Eglantine | Norway | 339 | Sunk |
| 26 June 1918 | Atlantian | United Kingdom | 9,399 | Sunk |
| 27 June 1918 | Llandovery Castle | Royal Canadian Navy | 11,423 | Sunk |
| 1 July 1918 | USS Covington | United States Navy | 16,339 | Sunk |
| 1 July 1918 | Origen | United Kingdom | 3,545 | Sunk |

== Bibliography ==
- Gröner, Erich; Jung, Dieter; Maass, Martin (1991). U-boats and Mine Warfare Vessels. German Warships 1815–1945. Vol. 2. Translated by Thomas, Keith; Magowan, Rachel. London: Conway Maritime Press. ISBN 0-85177-593-4.
