= List of shipwrecks in September 1915 =

The list of shipwrecks in September 1915 includes ships sunk, foundered, grounded, or otherwise lost during September 1915.

== 1 September ==
List of shipwrecks: 1 September 1915
Ship	State	Description
HMT Malta	Royal Navy	World War I: The naval trawler struck a mine and sank in the Thames Estuary with the loss of seven of her crew.
HMT Nadine	Royal Navy	World War I: The naval trawler struck a mine and sank in the Thames Estuary with the loss of nine of her crew.
Savona	United Kingdom	World War I: The cargo ship struck a mine and sank in the North Sea 0.5 nautical miles (930 m) off the Shipwash Lightship (United Kingdom) with the loss of three of her crew.
Whitefield	United Kingdom	World War I: The cargo ship was shelled and sunk in the Atlantic Ocean 95 nautical miles (176 km) north by west of Cape Wrath, Sutherland (59°45′N 6°00′W) by SM U-33 (Imperial German Navy). Her crew survived.

== 2 September ==
List of shipwrecks: 2 September 1915
Ship	State	Description
Marie	Norway	The coaster caught fire and sank in the Bay of Biscay. Her sixteen crew were rescued by Massalia ( Greece).Massalia
Roumanie	United Kingdom	World War I: The cargo ship was scuttled in the Atlantic Ocean 40 nautical miles (74 km) west of St. Kilda, Inverness-shire by SM U-20 (Imperial German Navy). Her crew survived.

== 3 September ==
List of shipwrecks: 3 September 1915
Ship	State	Description
Churston	United Kingdom	World War I: The collier struck a mine and sank in the North Sea 2.5 nautical miles (4.6 km) south of Orfordness, Suffolk (52°01′N 1°38′E) with the loss of four of her crew.
Frode	Denmark	World War I: The cargo ship was sunk in the Atlantic Ocean 60 nautical miles (110 km) west of Blasket Islands, County Kerry, United Kingdom (52°12′N 12°06′W) by SM U-20 (Imperial German Navy) with the loss of two crew.

== 4 September ==
List of shipwrecks: 4 September 1915
Ship	State	Description
Cymbeline	United Kingdom	World War I: The tanker was torpedoed and sunk in the Atlantic Ocean 29 nautical miles (54 km) west by south of the Fastnet Rock (51°16′N 12°04′W) by SM U-33 (Imperial German Navy) with the loss of six crew.
HMS E7	Royal Navy	World War I: The E-class submarine was caught in an anti-submarine net in the Dardanelles and was scuttled.
Glimt	Norway	World War I: The sailing vessel was sunk in the Atlantic Ocean 90 nautical miles (170 km) west by south of the Fastnet Rock (51°37′N 12°05′W) by SM U-33 (Imperial German Navy). Her crew survived.
Hesperian	United Kingdom	World War I: The passenger ship was torpedoed and sunk in the Atlantic Ocean 85 nautical miles (157 km) south west by south of the Fastnet Rock by SM U-20 (Imperial German Navy) with the loss of 32 lives.
Mimosa	United Kingdom	World War I: The cargo ship was shelled and sunk in the Atlantic Ocean 137 nautical miles (254 km) south west by south of the Fastnet Rock (49°26′N 12°00′W) by SM U-33 (Imperial German Navy). Her crew survived.
Natal Transport	United Kingdom	World War I: The cargo ship was shelled and sunk in the Mediterranean Sea 40 nautical miles (74 km) west of Gavdos, Greece by SM U-34 (Imperial German Navy). Her crew survived.
Storesand	Norway	World War I: The barque was sunk in the Atlantic Ocean off the Fastnet Rock by SM U-33 (Imperial German Navy). Her crew survived.

== 5 September ==
List of shipwrecks: 5 September 1915
Ship	State	Description
Dictator	United Kingdom	World War I: The cargo ship was shelled and sunk in the Atlantic Ocean 135 nautical miles (250 km) south by west of the Fastnet Rock (49°09′N 8°58′W) by SM U-20 (Imperial German Navy). Her crew survived.
Douro	United Kingdom	World War I: The cargo ship was shelled and sunk in the Atlantic Ocean 79 nautical miles (146 km) south west by west of the Bishop's Rock (48°55′N 7°48′W) by SM U-20 (Imperial German Navy). Her crew survived.
Rhea	Russia	World War I: The cargo ship was sunk in the Atlantic Ocean south west of the Fastnet Rock (48°24′N 7°24′W) by SM U-20 (Imperial German Navy). Nineteen crew were rescued by Velasquez (Spain).

== 6 September ==
List of shipwrecks: 6 September 1915
Ship	State	Description
Guatemala	France	World War I: The cargo ship was torpedoed, shelled and sunk in the Bay of Biscay 50 nautical miles (93 km) south west of Belle Île, Morbihan (46°50′N 4°02′W by SM U-20 (Imperial German Navy). Some of her crew were rescued by Iceland (United Kingdom), the rest made land in their lifeboat.
John Hardie	United Kingdom	World War I: The cargo ship was shelled and sunk in the Atlantic Ocean 98 nautical miles (181 km) west by south of Cape Finisterre, Spain (42°10′N 11°15′W) by SM U-33 (Imperial German Navy) with the loss of a crew member.

== 7 September ==
List of shipwrecks: 7 September 1915
Ship	State	Description
Bordeaux	France	World War I: The cargo ship was torpedoed, shelled and sunk in the Bay of Biscay 12 nautical miles (22 km) south west of the La Coubre Lighthouse by SM U-20 (Imperial German Navy). Her crew survived.
Caroni	United Kingdom	World War I: The cargo ship was torpedoed and sunk in the Bay of Biscay 15 nautical miles (28 km) south west of the Chassiron Lighthouse, Charente-Maritime, France by SM U-20 (Imperial German Navy). Her crew survived.
Constance	United Kingdom	World War I: The fishing smack was scuttled in the North Sea 44 nautical miles (81 km) east south east of Lowestoft, Suffolk by SM UB-2 (Imperial German Navy). Her crew were rescued by the trawler Vorano (United Kingdom).
Emanuel	United Kingdom	World War I: The fishing smack was scuttled in the North Sea 44 nautical miles (81 km) south east of Lowestoft by SM UB-2 (Imperial German Navy). Her crew were rescued by the trawler Vorano (United Kingdom).
Emblem	United Kingdom	World War I: The fishing smack was scuttled in the North Sea 44 nautical miles (81 km) east south east of Lowestoft by SM UB-16 (Imperial German Navy). Her crew survived.
Pollockshields	United Kingdom	The freighter ran aground on a reef off Elbow Beach, Bermuda and sank.
Victorious	United Kingdom	World War I: The fishing smack was scuttled in the North Sea 44 nautical miles (81 km) off Lowestoft by SM UB-16 (Imperial German Navy). Her crew were rescued by the trawler Vorano (United Kingdom).

== 8 September ==
List of shipwrecks: 8 September 1915
Ship	State	Description
SMS G12	Imperial German Navy	The V1-class destroyer collided with SMS V1 (Imperial German Navy) and was sunk in the North Sea by the detonation of one of her torpedoes.
Indien	French Navy	World War I: The auxiliary patrol boat was sunk in the Aegean Sea off Rhodes, Greece by SM U-34 (Imperial German Navy). Her crew survived.
King Albert	United Kingdom	The cargo ship struck a submerged object and sank 3 nautical miles (5.6 km) north west of Ceuta, Spain.
Monarch	United Kingdom	World War I: The cable layer struck a mine and sank in the English Channel 2.5 nautical miles (4.6 km) south of Folkestone, Kent with the loss of three of her crew.
Mora	United Kingdom	World War I: The cargo ship was shelled and sunk in the Bay of Biscay 68 nautical miles (126 km) west by south of Belle Île, Morbihan, France (46°50′N 4°40′W) by SM U-20 (Imperial German Navy). Her crew survived.

== 9 September ==
List of shipwrecks: 9 September 1915
Ship	State	Description
Balakani	United Kingdom	World War I: The tanker struck a mine and sank in the English Channel (51°31′N 1°22′E) with the loss of six of her crew.
Cornubia	United Kingdom	World War I: The cargo ship was shelled and sunk in the Mediterranean Sea 75 nautical miles (139 km) south east by south of Cartagena, Murcia, Spain (36°46′N 0°15′E) by SM U-39 (Imperial German Navy). Her crew survived.
Devonian	United Kingdom	World War I: The trawler struck a mine and sank in the North Sea 30 nautical miles (56 km) north east of the Spurn Lightship (United Kingdom) with the loss of nine of her crew.
Dervish	United States	The schooner yacht went ashore at Napatree Point, Rhode Island.
L'Aude	France	World War I: The cargo ship was shelled and sunk in the Mediterranean Sea 45 nautical miles (83 km) north north west of Oran, Algeria (36°23′N 0°59′W) by SM U-39 (Imperial German Navy).
Ville de Mostaganem	France	World War I: The cargo ship was sunk in the Mediterranean Sea 70 nautical miles (130 km) north east of Mostaganem, Algeria by SM U-39 (Imperial German Navy). Her crew survived.

== 10 September ==
List of shipwrecks: 10 September 1915
Ship	State	Description
Boy Ernie	United Kingdom	World War I: The fishing smack was scuttled in the North Sea 58 nautical miles (107 km) east of Cromer, Norfolk by SM UB-2 (Imperial German Navy). Her crew survived.
Caroline Gray	United States	The schooner sank at Vineyard Haven, Massachusetts after colliding with North Star. Raised, repaired and returned to service.
Nimrod	United Kingdom	World War I: The fishing smack was scuttled in the North Sea 45 nautical miles (83 km) east by south of Lowestoft, Suffolk by SM UB-16 (Imperial German Navy). Her crew survived.
Presto	Norway	World War I: The sailing ship was sunk in the North Sea 55 nautical miles (102 km) off Lindesnes, Lister og Mandal county, Norway (56°48′N 6°18′E) by SM U-6 (Imperial German Navy).
Wallsend	United Kingdom	The cargo ship collided with another ship and sank in the North Sea 2 nautical miles (3.7 km) off the Gull Lightship (United Kingdom).

== 11 September ==
List of shipwrecks: 11 September 1915
Ship	State	Description
Wansbeck	Norway	World War I: The sailing ship was sunk in the North Sea off Lindesnes, Lister og Mandal county, Norway by SM U-6 (Imperial German Navy).

== 12 September ==
List of shipwrecks: 12 September 1915
Ship	State	Description
Ashmore	United Kingdom	World War I: The cargo ship struck a mine and sank in the Thames Estuary 5 nautical miles (9.3 km) east of the Kentish Knock Lightship (United Kingdom) with the loss of four of her crew.
Bien	Norway	World War I: The three-masted auxiliary sailing ship was sunk in the North Sea off Kristiansand, Lister og Mandal county, Norway by SM U-6 (Imperial German Navy).
Canada II	French Navy	The naval trawler was lost on this date.
Norrbotten	Sweden	The cargo ship departed Narvik, Norway for Philadelphia, Pennsylvania. No further trace, presumed foundered with the loss of all hands.

== 13 September ==
List of shipwrecks: 13 September 1915
Ship	State	Description
Josephine Mary	France	The schooner collided with another vessel and sank whilst on a voyage from Briton Ferry, Glamorgan, United Kingdom to La Rochelle, Charente-Maritime.
Norte	Norway	World War I: The coaster was sunk in the North Sea 7 nautical miles (13 km) east north east of Lindesnes, Lister og Mandal county, Norway by SM U-6 (Imperial German Navy).

== 14 September ==
List of shipwrecks: 14 September 1915
Ship	State	Description
HMT City of Dundee	Royal Navy	The 125.3-foot (38.2 m), 269-ton steam patrol ship/naval trawler was lost in a collision with "Patroclus" (Netherlands) off Folkstone. Her C. O., and 7 crew rescued by Patroclus, and 2 by "Mistley", 7 lost.
Gartmore	Royal Navy	World War I: The Admiralty-purchased cargo ship was scuttled at Scapa Flow as a blockship.
Lapland	United Kingdom	World War I: The Admiralty-requisitioned cargo ship was scuttled at Scapa Flow as a blockship.

== 15 September ==
List of shipwrecks: 15 September 1915
Ship	State	Description
Patagonia	United Kingdom	World War I: The 6,011 GRT transport ship was torpedoed and sunk in the Black Sea 10.5 nautical miles (19.4 km) off Odesa by SM UB-7 (Imperial German Navy). Her crew survived.
Reginald	United Kingdom	World War I: The Admiralty-requisitioned cargo ship was scuttled in East Weddel Sound, Scapa Flow, as a blockship.
SM U-6	Imperial German Navy	World War I: The Type U 5 submarine was torpedoed and sunk in the North Sea off Stavanger in Rogaland county, Norway (59°10′N 5°09′E) by HMS E16 (Royal Navy) with the loss of 24 of her 29 crew.

== 16 September ==
List of shipwrecks: 16 September 1915
Ship	State	Description
Africa	United Kingdom	World War I: The cargo ship struck a mine and was damaged in the English Channel off Kingsdown, Kent with the loss of two of her crew. She was beached at Deal but was declared a total loss.
Ruth	Sweden	The wooden schooner departed from Stettin for Gothenburg. No further trace, presumed foundered in the Baltic Sea with the loss of the crew of four.

== 17 September ==
List of shipwrecks: 17 September 1915
Ship	State	Description
Lorne	Royal Navy	World War I: The Admiralty-purchased cargo ship was scuttled at Scapa Flow as a blockship. Later blown up and partially scrapped.
Onoko	United States	The cargo ship sprang a leak and foundered off Knife Island, Lake Superior.
Ravitailleur	France	World War I: The cargo ship was shelled and sunk in the Mediterranean Sea off Iapetera, Crete, Greece (34°28′N 25°50′E) by SM U-35 (Imperial German Navy). Her crew survived.

== 18 September ==
List of shipwrecks: 18 September 1915
Ship	State	Description
Lillie	United States	While under tow by a tug from Dime City to Golovin, Territory of Alaska, carrying three crewmen and no cargo, the 26-ton scow broke away from the tug during a storm in Norton Sound near Cape Darby (64.3267°N 162.7853°W) and was stranded without loss of life at Rocky Point (64°24′N 163°08′W), apparently becoming a total loss.
HMT Lydian	Royal Navy	World War I: The naval trawler struck a mine and sank in the English Channel off South Foreland, Kent with the loss of eight of her crew.
Forsvik	Sweden	World War I: The cargo ship, en route from Hull to Stockholm, sank after striking a mine in the North Sea at (56°0′N 3°50′E). No casualties.

== 19 September ==
List of shipwrecks: 19 September 1915
Ship	State	Description
Athinai	Greece	Survivors from SS Athinai The passenger ship caught fire and sank in the Atlantic Ocean (40°54′N 58°47′W) with the loss of one of the 508 people on board. Survivors were rescued by Roumanian Prince and Tuscania (both United Kingdom).
Ramazan	United Kingdom	World War I: The cargo ship was shelled and sunk in the Mediterranean Sea 55 nautical miles (102 km) off Cerigotto, Greece by SM U-35 (Imperial German Navy) with the loss of a crew member.

== 20 September ==
List of shipwrecks: 20 September 1915
Ship	State	Description
Horden	United Kingdom	World War I: The cargo ship struck a mine and sank in the North Sea off Aldeburgh, Suffolk. Her crew survived.
Krokodil	Imperial Russian Navy	The Kaiman-class submarine ran aground off "Alo Ern Island" with the loss of a crew member. She was refloated with assistance from the tug Arkona (Russia).
Linkmoor	United Kingdom	World War I: The collier was shelled and sunk in the Mediterranean Sea 50 nautical miles (93 km) off Cape Matapan, Greece (36°16′N 21°18′E) by SM U-35 (Imperial German Navy). Her crew survived.
Thorvaldsen	Denmark	World War I: The cargo ship was sunk in the Skagerrak 34 nautical miles (63 km) west of Hanstholm (56°47′N 7°09′E) by SM U-16 (Imperial German Navy). Her crew survived.

== 21 September ==
List of shipwrecks: 21 September 1915
Ship	State	Description
Diamond L	United States	The small motor schooner was crushed in ice and lost on the coast of Siberia.

== 22 September ==
List of shipwrecks: 22 September 1915
Ship	State	Description
Koningin Emma	Netherlands	World War I: The passenger ship struck a mine and sank in the North Sea 1 nautical mile (1.9 km) west of the Shipwash Lightship (United Kingdom).

== 23 September ==
List of shipwrecks: 23 September 1915
Ship	State	Description
Anglo-Colombian	United Kingdom	World War I: The cargo ship was shelled and sunk in the Atlantic Ocean 79 nautical miles (146 km) south east of the Fastnet Rock by SM U-41 (Imperial German Navy). Her crew survived.
Chancellor	United Kingdom	World War I: The cargo ship was shelled and sunk in the Atlantic Ocean 86 nautical miles (159 km) south by east of the Fastnet Rock (50°08′N 8°17′W) by SM U-41 (Imperial German Navy). Her crew survived.
Groningen	United Kingdom	World War I: The coaster struck a mine and sank in the Thames Estuary with the loss of a crew member.
Hesione	United Kingdom	World War I: The cargo ship was shelled and sunk in the Atlantic Ocean 86 nautical miles (159 km) south by east of the Fastnet Rock (50°15′N 8°30′W) by SM U-41 (Imperial German Navy). Her crew survived.
Minnie Slauson	United States	The schooner sank near Handkerchief Shoal, Massachusetts, after colliding with the Handkerchief Shoal Lightship. Later raised.
Saint Pierre I	French Navy	World War I: The naval trawler was sunk in the North Sea off the Dyck Lightship (51°02′N 2°06′E) by SM UB-17 (Imperial German Navy) with the loss of seventeen of her eighteen crew.

== 24 September ==
List of shipwrecks: 24 September 1915
Ship	State	Description
HMT Great Heart	Royal Navy	World War I: The naval trawler struck a mine and sank in the English Channel off the South Goodwin Lightship (United Kingdom) with the loss of eight of her crew.
Minnie Slauson	United States	The schooner sank near the Bishop & Clerk Ledge after colliding with the Handkerchief Shoal Lightship ( United States Lighthouse Service).
Urbino	United Kingdom	World War I: The cargo ship was shelled and sunk in the Atlantic Ocean 67 nautical miles (124 km) south west by west of the Bishop Rock, Isles of Scilly by SM U-41 (Imperial German Navy). Her crew survived.
SM U-41	Imperial German Navy	World War I: The Type U 31 submarine was shelled and sunk in the Western Approaches (49°10′N 7°23′W) by HMS Wyandra (Royal Navy) with the loss of 35 of her 37 crew.
Western Star	United States	The cargo ship was wrecked/stranded on Robertson's Rock in the North Channel of Georgian Bay, Lake Huron, and abandoned as a total loss. Salvaged in 1917, repaired and returned to service in 1918 as Glenisla (Canada).

== 25 September ==
List of shipwrecks: 25 September 1915
Ship	State	Description
Carrie	United States	The motor vessel was lost at Tanana, Territory of Alaska.
HMY Sanda	Royal Navy	World War I: The naval yacht was sunk by gunfire in the North Sea off the coast of Belgium.
Venetia	Imperial German Navy	World War I: The minesweeper was torpedoed and sunk in the mouth of the Ems on the northwestern coast of Germany by the submarine HMS E5 (Royal Navy).

== 26 September ==
List of shipwrecks: 26 September 1915
Ship	State	Description
Carrier	United States	While no one was aboard, the 6-gross register ton, 38.2-foot (11.6 m) motor vessel was destroyed by fire at Tanana, Territory of Alaska.
Ellen Benzon	Denmark	World War I: The schooner was sunk in the North Sea (56°51′N 3°53′E) by SM U-16 (Imperial German Navy). Her crew survived.
Robert Palmer	United States	The sloop went ashore at Mumford Cove near Groton Long Point, Connecticut.
Vigilant	United Kingdom	World War I: The pilot boat struck a mine and sank in the North Sea with the loss of fourteen of her crew.

== 27 September ==
List of shipwrecks: 27 September 1915
Ship	State	Description
Benedetto Brin	Regia Marina	World War I: The Regina Margherita-class battleship was sunk at Brindisi, Apulia due to sabotage by Austro-Hungarian forces with the loss of 454 of her 841 crew.
HMS Caribbean	Royal Navy	The 419.9-foot (128.0 m), 5,824-ton accommodation ship, or troop ship, sprung a leak in a heavy gale in the Atlantic Ocean 35 nautical miles (65 km) off Cape Wrath, Sutherland, on 26 September. She was abandoned at Midnight. She sank in the morning with the loss of fifteen of her crew. Survivors were rescued by HMS Birkenhead and the trawler HMT Princess Alice (both Royal Navy).
Lochranza	United Kingdom	The schooner was driven ashore and wrecked at Nairn.
Nigretia	United Kingdom	World War I: The cargo ship struck a mine and was damaged in the English Channel off the South Goodwin Lightship (United Kingdom). She was beached but was later refloated.
Vincent	United States	World War I: The schooner was sunk by a mine in the White Sea off Cape Orlov, Russia. Four wounded.

== 28 September ==
List of shipwrecks: 28 September 1915
Ship	State	Description
H. C. Henry	Canada	World War I: The tanker was shelled and sunk in the Mediterranean Sea 59 nautical miles (109 km) south of Cape Matapan, Greece (35°36′N 22°42′E) by SM U-39 (Imperial German Navy). Her crew survived.
Isabel	United States	Carrying passengers and cargo, the sidewheel paddle steamer ran aground off Shippan Point, five miles (8.0 km) south of Stamford, Connecticut, and sank in 20 feet (6.1 m) of water, later breaking up.

== 29 September ==
List of shipwrecks: 29 September 1915
Ship	State	Description
Actie	Norway	World War I: The barque was sunk in the North Sea 20 nautical miles (37 km) south west of Lindesnes, Lister og Mandal county, Norway by SM U-16 (Imperial German Navy). Her crew survived.
Brookhill	United States	1915 New Orleans hurricane: The night ferry steamer sank at dock on the Mississippi River along with its sister ship, Istrouma, in Baton Rouge, Louisiana, during a storm. The ferry previously sank on 30 November 1908, but was raised and repaired.
Corsair	United States	1915 New Orleans hurricane: The tow steamer capsized and sank near Nine Mile Point, Louisiana. Four killed.
Flora	Norway	World War I: The sailing vessel was stopped and scuttled in the North Sea 35 nautical miles (65 km) west north west of Lindesnes, Lister og Mandal county, Norway by SM U-16 (Imperial German Navy). Her crew survived.
Forth	United Kingdom	The full-rigged ship was abandoned whilst on a voyage from Liverpool, Lancashire to Port Arthur, Texas, United States.
Grange	United Kingdom	The Thames barge came ashore five nautical miles (9.3 km) west of Margate Pier, Kent and was wrecked. Her crew were rescued by the Margate Lifeboat.
Haydn	United Kingdom	World War I: The cargo ship was scuttled in the Mediterranean Sea 80 nautical miles (150 km) south by east of Gavdos, Greece (33°24′N 24°40′E) by SM U-39 (Imperial German Navy). Her crew survived.
Hazel	United States	1915 New Orleans hurricane: The passenger vessel tied up at Grand Bayou Point and was blown across the bayou and capsized and sunk. Four crew and two passengers killed.
Istrouma	United States	1915 New Orleans hurricane: The day ferry steamer broke from its dock on the Mississippi River and sank along with its sister ship, Brookhill, in Baton Rouge, Louisiana, during a storm.
Leading Chief	(United Kingdom of Great Britain and Ireland) Guernsey	The barquentine was wrecked on the Little Sunk Sand, in the North Sea off the coast of Essex. Her six crew were rescued by the Clacton Lifeboat.
P. J. Abler	United States	While under repair at Douglas Island in Southeast Alaska, the 116-gross register ton, 97.2-foot (29.6 m) motor vessel was destroyed by a fire that began when someone dropped a lit candle into her bilge; the fire burned her down to the bilge. All 16 people on board survived.

== 30 September ==
List of shipwrecks: 30 September 1915
Ship	State	Description
Albion	United Kingdom	World War I: The fishing smack struck a mine and sank in the English Channel 8 nautical miles (15 km) south by west of Berry Head, Devon with the loss of three of her crew.
Branlebas	French Navy	World War I: The Branlebas-class destroyer struck a mine and sank in the North Sea between Dunkirk, France, and Nieuwpoort, Belgium.
Cirene	Italy	World War I: The cargo ship was shelled and sunk in the Mediterranean Sea 85 nautical miles (157 km) south of Koufonisi, Crete, Greece (34°20′N 26°19′E) by SM U-39 (Imperial German Navy). Her crew survived.
Dredge #7	United States	The dredge caught fire and sank off Gaspee Point, Providence, Rhode Island.
E. Marie Brown	United States	The schooner ran ashore on Stone Horse Shoal, Massachusetts. Pulled off by a United States Coast Guard cutter.
Florida	Norway	World War I: The barge was stopped and sunk in the North Sea 40 nautical miles (74 km) off Lindesnes, Lister og Mandal county, Norway by SM U-16 (Imperial German Navy). Her crew survived.
Millan Carrabco	Spain	The coaster foundered in the Bay of Biscay off Luarca, Asturias, with the loss of all hands.
Tobia	Italy	World War I: The sailing vessel was scuttled in the Ionian Sea off Ithaka, Greece (37°58′N 19°22′E) by SM U-33 (Imperial German Navy).

== Unknown date ==
List of shipwrecks: Unknown date 1915
Ship	State	Description
Aorangi	Royal Navy	World War I: The cargo ship was sunk as a blockship in Holm Sound, at Scapa Flow, Orkney Islands on 10 August or sometime in September 1915. Raised in 1920 and either broke loose from her moorings and sank at Canniesile, or used as a stores ship at Malta.
