= List of shipwrecks in February 1915 =

The list of shipwrecks in February 1915 includes ships sunk, foundered, grounded, or otherwise lost during February 1915.

== 2 February ==
List of shipwrecks: 2 February 1915
Ship	State	Description
Eastern	United States	The dredge foundered in a severe storm near Port Jefferson, New York. The hull was raised and sunk again near the Port Jefferson Light. All four crew were killed.
Laura	United Kingdom	The schooner ran aground at Battery Point, Stornoway, Isle of Lewis and was wrecked. Her crew were rescued by rocket apparatus.
Svecia	Sweden	World War I: The 2,156 GRT cargo ship departed Liverpool, bound for Aarhus with a cargo of maize on 30 January. Passed Cape Wrath on 2 February, no further trace, presumed foundered with the loss of all 18 hands. Swedish official War statistics puts the likely cause as having struck a mine.

== 3 February ==
List of shipwrecks: 3 February 1915
Ship	State	Description
HMS Clan Macnaughton	Royal Navy	The armed merchant cruiser foundered in the Atlantic Ocean north of Ireland with the loss of all 281 crew.
Ferdinando Viareggio	Italy	The brigantine came ashore on Pointe Chiappa, near Portovecchio and was wrecked with the loss of two of her seven crew.
Semantha	Norway	The 2,279 GRT barque on a voyage from Portland for Queenstown with a cargo of wheat, was intercepted and sunk by SMS Kronprinz Wilhelm (Imperial German Navy) in approximate position 26°08′S 27°18′W.

== 4 February ==
List of shipwrecks: 4 February 1915
Ship	State	Description
Alfonso XIII	Spain	The 5,000 GRT ocean liner anchored at Santander with a cargo of coffee from Cuba, capsized during the storm that hit the city, and consequntly sank. Her crew survived.
Chester	Netherlands	The 2,568 GRT tanker on a voyage from New York for Rotterdam with a cargo of petroleum, ran into a hurricane in the Atlantic Ocean on 2 February. After two day struggle to save the vessel, she was abandoned by her crew and set afire in approximate position 47°06′N 32°53′W. The crew was saved by Philadelphia.
Fleetly	United Kingdom	The 225 GRT schooner on a trip from Louisbourg for St. John's with a cargo of coal, was abandoned in the Atlantic Ocean (42°46′N 51°53′W). All seven crew were rescued by Mechanicien (United States).
I'll Away	United Kingdom	The schooner was abandoned in the Bristol Channel of Swansea, Glamorgan. Her crew were rescued by the Mumbles Lifeboat. I'll Away was later salvaged.
Margaret K. Schwartz	United Kingdom	The schooner was driven ashore at St. Mary's, Newfoundland and was wrecked.

== 5 February ==
List of shipwrecks: 5 February 1915
Ship	State	Description
Albia	United Kingdom	The 2,482 GRT cargo ship on a trip from Sagunto for Jarrow with a cargo of iron ore, ran aground on White Stones Rocks off Sunderland and was wrecked.
Dauntless	United States	The schooner yacht sank at her moorings at Essex, Connecticut, a total loss. She was removed by breaking her up.
London Trader	United Kingdom	The 684 GRT coaster on a trip from London for Dublin with general cargo, ran into a strong gale and foundered in the Atlantic Ocean off Penzance, Cornwall with the loss of nine of her fourteen crew. Survivors were rescued by Poland and Toward (both United Kingdom).

== 6 February ==
List of shipwrecks: 6 February 1915
Ship	State	Description
HMS Adjutant	Royal Navy	The naval tug was lost on this date.
HMS Erne	Royal Navy	The E-class destroyer was wrecked at Rattray Head, Aberdeenshire. Her crew survived.
Potaro	United Kingdom	The 4,419 GRT refrigerated cargo ship was scuttled in the Atlantic Ocean. She had been captured on 10 January, 560 nautical miles (1,040 km) east by north of Pernambuco, Brazil by SMS Kronprinz Wilhelm (Imperial German Navy). Her 47 crew were taken as prisoners of war.

== 7 February ==
List of shipwrecks: 7 February 1915
Ship	State	Description
Imataca	Norway	The 2,227 GRT cargo ship on a passage from Bergen for Baltimore in ballast, was abandoned in sinking condition in the Atlantic Ocean (42°36′N 38°33′W). Her crew was saved by El Zorro (United Kingdom).
Michael A. Andritsakis	Greece	The 1,758 GRT cargo ship on a passage from London for Sunderland in ballast, was driven onto the Bondicar Rocks, in the North Sea off Amble, Northumberland, United Kingdom and subsequently wrecked. Her crew were rescued by rocket apparatus.
William H. Yerkes	United States	The 1,498 GRT schooner on a voyage from Tampa for Baltimore with a cargo of phosphate rock, ran aground on Frying Pan Shoals, and was wrecked.

== 8 February ==
List of shipwrecks: 8 February 1915
Ship	State	Description
Frigga	Norway	The 971 GRT coaster on a trip from Goole for Rotterdam with a cargo of coal and general cargo, struck submerged wreckage and foundered in the North Sea between Leman Bank and Smith’s Knoll. Her crew was saved by two fishing trawlers.

== 11 February ==
List of shipwrecks: 11 February 1915
Ship	State	Description
SP 4 Pallanza	Imperial German Navy	World War I: The 4,606 GRT Sperrbrecher, converted cargo ship, struck a German mine off the mouth of the Ems, and sank.

== 12 February ==
List of shipwrecks: 12 February 1915
Ship	State	Description
Invercoe	United Kingdom	World War I: The 1,421 GRT barque on a trip from Portland for Queenstown with a cargo of wheat, was intercepted and subsequently scuttled in the Atlantic Ocean 890 nautical miles (1,650 km) east by south of Cape Frio by auxiliary cruiser Prinz Eitel Friedrich (Imperial German Navy).
Jack Snipe	United States	The dredger was destroyed by fire at San Francisco, California.
Morion	United Kingdom	The coaster was rammed and sunk at Queen's Dock, Glasgow, Renfrewshire by Jarnac (United Kingdom).
Nam Yong	United Kingdom	The 1,512 GRT cargo ship on a trip from Singapore for Batavia and Samarang with general cargo and 17 passengers, ran aground on the reef off the Brenti Light, near Pulau Sambo, and was wrecked. There were no casulaties.

== 13 February ==
List of shipwrecks: 13 February 1915
Ship	State	Description
Andromeda	United Kingdom	The 1,928 GRT barque on a trip from Tacoma for Falmouth with a cargo of wheat, ran into a strong gale and ran aground on Killygerran Head, off Portscatho with a loss of one crew.
HMT Bedouin	Royal Navy	World War I:The 115-foot (35 m) minesweeping naval trawler was sunk when a German mine, laid by SMS Berlin (Imperial German Navy), came up in her sweeping gear and exploded off Tory Island, County Donegal, Ireland, UK. All crew survived.
Hull Trader	United Kingdom	The 304 GRT coaster on a trip from Mistley for Dublin with a cargo of malt, ran into a strong gale and foundered in the English Channel off the South Goodwin Lightship (United Kingdom) with the loss of four of her seven crew. The survivors were rescued by a Royal Navy destroyer.
Morinier	Belgium	The 1,874 GRT cargo ship on a trip from Cardiff for Lisbon with a cargo of coal, foundered in the Bay of Biscay (47°01′N 7°48′W) with the loss of seventeen of the 22 people on board. Survivors were rescued by Vasco da Gama (Portugal).
Rurik	Imperial Russian Navy	The cruiser ran aground east of Gotland, Sweden and was severely damaged. She was refloated and taken in to Reval. Subsequently repaired at Kronstadt.
SMS V25	Imperial German Navy	World War I: The V25-class torpedo boat struck a mine and sank in the North Sea with the loss of 79 of her crew.

== 14 February ==
List of shipwrecks: 14 February 1915
Ship	State	Description
Abeokuta	United Kingdom	The 1,817 GRT cargo ship on a trip from Liverpool for West African ports with general cargo, ran into a hurricane and foundered in the Bay of Biscay, about 70 nautical miles (130 km) southwest of Ouessant.
Enterprise	United States	The tug sank in the harbor of New Haven, Connecticut, after she was rammed by the steamer York.

== 15 February ==
List of shipwrecks: 15 February 1915
Ship	State	Description
Dulwich	United Kingdom	World War I: The 3,289 GRT cargo ship on a trip from Hull for Rouen with a cargo of coal, was torpedoed and sunk in the English Channel 6 nautical miles (11 km) north of Cap d'Antifer, Seine-Inférieure by SM U-16 (Imperial German Navy) with the loss of two crew.
Membland	United Kingdom	The 3,027 GRT cargo ship left Hull for Tyne in ballast. Dissappeared without a trace, never heard from again. Presumed hit a naval mine and sank with the loss of all 25 people on board.
Ville de Lille	France	World War I: The 977 GRT coaster on a trip Cherbourg for Dunkerque with a cargo of stone, was scuttled in the English Channel off Le Havre, Seine-Inférieure by SM U-16 (Imperial German Navy). All crew survived.

== 16 February ==
List of shipwrecks: 16 February 1915
Ship	State	Description
Mary	Sweden	World War I: The 1,357 GRT cargo ship departed Seaham Harbour, bound for Malmö with a cargo of coal. No further trace, presumed foundered with the loss of all hands, a total of 18. Swedish official War statistics states that mine explosion "cannot be ruled out".

== 17 February ==
List of shipwrecks: 17 February 1915
Ship	State	Description
Kate	United Kingdom	The schooner collided with Magnetic (United Kingdom) in the Crosby Channel and sank with the loss of three of her four crew.
Polly Bridge	United Kingdom	The 153 GRT sailing ketch on a trip from Hull for London with a cargo of flour, was wrecked in the North Sea on the North Haisboro Sands.
Proba	United Kingdom	The 105 GRT three-masted schooner on a trip from Charlestown for London with a cargo of china clay, stranded on the Brake Sands and was wrecked. Her crew were rescued by the North Deal Lifeboat.
Reaper	United Kingdom	The schooner was driven ashore at Holyhead, Anglesey and was wrecked. All five crew survived, three of them were rescued by the Holyhead Lifeboat.
St. Clair	United Kingdom	The 112 GRT schooner was driven ashore and wrecked at Challaborough, Devon.

== 18 February ==
List of shipwrecks: 18 February 1915
Ship	State	Description
General Alexander MacKenzie	United States	The dredge capsized and sank in a severe gale off Cape Hatteras. Five crew were killed.
Ferro	Sweden	The 1,222 GRT cargo ship on a trip from Immingham for Oxelösund with a cargo of coal, ran aground on Hävringe and was wrecked. Her crew was rescued.
John D. Colwell	United States	The schooner ran aground off Santa Isabel, Puerto Rico and was a total loss.
Mary Ada Short	United Kingdom	World War I: The 3,605 GRT cargo ship on a trip from St. Nicolas for Port St. Vincente with a cargo of grain, was captured and subsequently scuttled in the Atlantic Ocean 400 nautical miles (740 km) east by north of Pernambuco by auxiliary cruiser Prinz Eitel Friedrich (Imperial German Navy).

== 19 February ==
List of shipwrecks: 19 February 1915
Ship	State	Description
HMT Blakedown	Royal Navy	The naval trawler was lost on this date.
Floride	France	The 6,629 GRT passenger-cargo ship on a trip from Bordeaux for Buenos Aires with general cargo and 86 passengers, was captured and scuttled in the Atlantic Ocean northeast of Fernando Noronha (02°28′S 31°10′W) by auxiliary cruiser Prinz Eitel Friedrich (Imperial German Navy).
HMS Goldfinch	Royal Navy	The Acorn-class destroyer ran aground at Start Point, Sanday, Orkney Islands and was a total loss.
SMS S14	Imperial German Navy	The S13-class torpedo boat suffered an internal explosion and sank in the Jade Bight.

== 20 February ==
List of shipwrecks: 20 February 1915
Ship	State	Description
Almeria	United Kingdom	World War I: The Admiralty requisitioned cargo ship was scuttled in Skerry Sound, Scapa Flow as a block ship. Scrapped in place at some time.
Bjerka	Norway	World War I: The 630 GRT coaster on a trip from Burntisland for Nakskov with a cargo of coal, struck two mines in Nakskov Fjord and sank. Her crew survived.
Cambank	United Kingdom	World War I: The 3,112 GRT cargo ship on a trip from Huelva for Garston with a cargo of copper ore and ingots, was torpedoed and sunk in the Irish Sea 10 nautical miles (19 km) off Point Lynas, Anglesey (53°25′N 4°00′W) by SM U-30 (Imperial German Navy) with the loss of four of her 25 crew.
HMT Corcyra	Royal Navy	The naval trawler was lost on this date.
Downshire	United Kingdom	World War I: The 337 GRT coaster on a passage from Dundrum for Manchester with empty cement bags, was scuttled in the Irish Sea off Point Lynas (54°03′N 5°15′W) by SM U-30 (Imperial German Navy). Her crew survived.
Evelyn	United States	World War I: The 1,963 GRT cargo ship on a voyage from New York for Bremen with a cargo of cotton, struck a mine and sank in the North Sea off Borkum, Lower Saxony, Germany. Her crew were rescued by a German vessel.
Maggie Barratt	United Kingdom	The schooner departed Greenock, Renfrewshire for the River Duddon. She subsequently foundered in the Irish Sea with the loss of all hands. Wreckage from the ship washed up at Maughold Head, Isle of Man.
Willerby	United Kingdom	World War I: The 3,630 GRT cargo ship on a passage from Marseille for River Plate in ballast, was captured and subsequently scuttled in the Atlantic Ocean 490 nautical miles (910 km) north east by north of Pernambuco (01°18′S 29°54′W) by auxiliary cruiser Prinz Eitel Friedrich (Imperial German Navy).

== 22 February ==
List of shipwrecks: 22 February 1915
Ship	State	Description
Carib	United States	World War I: The 2,087 GRT cargo ship on a trip from Charleston for Bremen with a cargo of cotton, struck a mine in the North Sea 10 nautical miles (19 km) north of Wangerooge with the loss of three crew.
Carbones Asturianos	Spain	The 576 GRT coaster departed Gijon on 21 February bound for Pasajes with a cargo of coal. Last seen next day, dissappeared without a trace, not heard from since.
Guadeloupe	France	The 6,603 GRT passenger-cargo ship on a voyage from Buenos Aires for Bordeaux with general cargo and 132 passengers, was captured in the Atlantic Ocean off Fernando de Noronha by auxiliary cruiser SMS Kronprinz Wilhelm (Imperial German Navy). After transferring valuable supplies, the ship was scuttled on 25 February.

== 23 February ==
List of shipwrecks: 23 February 1915
Ship	State	Description
Branksome Chine	United Kingdom	World War I: The 2,026 GRT collier on a trip from Grimsby for Portsmouth with a cargo of coal, was torpedoed and sunk in the English Channel 6 nautical miles (11 km) south of Beachy Head, Sussex by SM U-8 (Imperial German Navy). Her twenty crew survived.
City of Mysore	United Kingdom	The 5,294 GRT on a voyage from Calcutta for London with general cargo, ran aground on Kumuriya Ridge, about 3/4 nautical mile (1.4 km) off Komari, Ceylon, and was wrecked.
Oakby	United Kingdom	World War I: The 1,976 GRT collier on a passage from London for Barry Roads in ballast, was torpedoed and damaged in the English Channel 4 nautical miles (7.4 km) east by north of the Royal Sovereign Lightship (United Kingdom) by SM U-8 (Imperial German Navy). She was taken in tow but sank the next day off Folkestone, Kent. Her twenty crew survived.
Regin	Norway	World War I: The 1,844 GRT cargo ship on a trip from Tyne for Bordeaux with a cargo of coal, hit a mine and sank in the English Channel 7 nautical miles (13 km) norteast of the Goodwin Sands, Kent while leaving anchorage. Her 23 crew were rescued by a Royal Navy torpedo boat destroyer.
HMT Tern	Royal Navy	The naval trawler was lost on this date.

== 24 February ==
List of shipwrecks: 24 February 1915
Ship	State	Description
Dague	French Navy	World War I: The Bouclier-class destroyer struck a mine and sank at Bar, Montenegro with the loss of 38 of her crew.
Harpalion	United Kingdom	World War I: The 5,867 GRT cargo ship on a passage from London for Cape Henry in ballast, was torpedoed and sunk in the English Channel 6.5 nautical miles (12.0 km) west of the Royal Sovereign Lightship (United Kingdom) by SM U-8 (Imperial German Navy) with the loss of three crew.
Rio Parana	United Kingdom	World War I: The 4,015 GRT cargo ship on a trip from Tyne for Portoferraio with a cargo of coal, was torpedoed and sunk in the English Channel 4 nautical miles (7.4 km) south east of Beachy Head, Sussex by SM U-8 (Imperial German Navy). Her crew survived.
Western Coast	United Kingdom	World War I: The 1,165 GRT cargo ship on a trip from London for Liverpool with general cargo, was torpedoed and sunk in the English Channel 8 nautical miles (15 km) south of Beachy Head by SM U-8 (Imperial German Navy). Her nineteen crew survived.

== 25 February ==
List of shipwrecks: 25 February 1915
Ship	State	Description
Orozco	Spain	The 2,589 GRT cargo ship on a trip from Bilbao for Middlesbrough with a cargo of iron ore, foundered in the Bay of Biscay 50 nautical miles (93 km) off La Rochelle, Charente-Maritime, France. Her crew were rescued by a tug.

== 27 February ==
List of shipwrecks: 27 February 1915
Ship	State	Description
Cleo II	United Kingdom	World War I: The Admiralty-requisitioned cargo ship was scuttled at Scapa Flow as a blockship, but charges failed to detonate, ship sank uselessly out of place.
Conway Castle	United Kingdom	World War I: The sailing vessel was scuttled in the Pacific Ocean 560 nautical miles (1,040 km) south west by west of Valparaíso, Chile, by SMS Dresden (Imperial German Navy).
Fjord	Norway	The 1,527 GRT cargo ship on a trip from Glasgow for Bayonne with a cargo of coal, ran aground on Adour Bar, off Bayonne, and was stranded. The salvage attempt failed, as the ship broke in two and sank.
Minieh	United Kingdom	World War I: The Admiralty-requisitioned cargo ship was scuttled at Scapa Flow as a block ship.
Pet	United Kingdom	The 162 GRT schooner on a trip from London for Hull with a cargo of manure, was abandoned in the North Sea. She was driven ashore at Spurn Point, Yorkshire and was a total loss.
William and Alice	United Kingdom	The schooner on a trip from London for Hull with a cargo of scrap iron, was driven ashore at Spurn Point and was a total loss. Her crew were rescued.

== Unknown date ==
List of shipwrecks: Unknown date 1915
Ship	State	Description
Chr. Christensen	Denmark	The cargo ship came ashore at Longstone Point, Northumberland, United Kingdom. Her crew were taken off by lifeboat on 17 February and the ship was declared a total loss.
