= SM U-30 (Germany) =

History

German Empire
- Name: U-30
- Ordered: 19 February 1912
- Builder: Kaiserliche Werft Danzig
- Yard number: 20
- Launched: 15 November 1913
- Commissioned: 26 August 1914
- Fate: Surrendered 22 November 1918. Broken up at Blyth in 1919-20.

General characteristics
- Class & type: Type U 27 submarine
- Displacement: 675 t (664 long tons) surfaced; 878 t (864 long tons) submerged
- Length: 64.70 m (212 ft 3 in) (o/a)
- Beam: 6.32 m (20 ft 9 in)
- Draught: 3.48 m (11 ft 5 in)
- Speed: 16.7 knots (30.9 km/h; 19.2 mph) surfaced; 9.8 knots (18.1 km/h; 11.3 mph) submerged
- Range: 9,770 nmi (18,090 km; 11,240 mi) at 8 knots (15 km/h; 9.2 mph) surfaced; 85 nmi (157 km; 98 mi) at 5 knots (9.3 km/h; 5.8 mph) submerged
- Test depth: 50 m (164 ft)
- Complement: 4 officers, 31 enlisted
- Armament: 4 × 50 cm (19.7 in) torpedo tubes; 1 × 8.8 cm (3.5 in) SK L/30 deck gun

Service record
- Part of: IV Flotilla; Unknown start – 19 November 1917; Training Flotilla; 19 November 1917 – 11 November 1918
- Commanders: Kptlt. Erich von Rosenberg-Grusczyski; 25 September 1914 – 22 June 1915; Kptlt. Franz Grünert; 1 May 1916 – 20 November 1917
- Operations: 6 patrols
- Victories: 27 merchant ships sunk (48,060 GRT); 1 merchant ship damaged (5,189 GRT)

SM U-30 (Note: "SM" stands for "Seiner Majestät" (English: His Majesty's) and combined with the U for Unterseeboot would be translated as His Majesty's Submarine.) was one of 329 U-boat submarines serving in the Imperial German Navy in World War I. She engaged in commerce warfare as part of the First Battle of the Atlantic. U-30 is significant for the torpedoing of the US tanker Gulflight on 1 May 1915 20 nautical miles (37 km; 23 mi) west of Scilly.

== Torpedoing of Gulflight ==
The particular mission when Gulflight was attacked commenced 24 April 1915. On 28 April U-30 intercepted the 1,905 GRT collier Mobile which she sank by gunfire after allowing the crew to escape. On 29 April she similarly sank the 3,220 GRT Cherbury. 30 April she ordered the steamer Fulgent to halt, but when the ship failed to do so fired a shot into the ship's bridge, which killed the captain and quartermaster. The ship stopped and the rest of the crew were allowed to escape before the ship was sunk by explosive charges placed inside. That afternoon, the 3,102 GRT Svorno was stopped and sunk. On 1 May the grain carrier Edale and French ship Europe were sunk. A Dutch ship was stopped and, as a neutral, permitted to continue at a point some 45 nautical miles (83 km; 52 mi) north west of the Scilly Isles, but the submarine was spotted at this point by a steam drifter, Clara Alice which reported her position to a naval patrol.

The patrol ships HMS Iago and Filey started to hunt for the submarine, but succeeded only in intercepting the US-flagged Gulflight, which they took under escort. The escort proved something of a disadvantage to Gulflight because she was obliged to slow down for the patrol and then, under international law, as a ship escorted by armed vessels became a legitimate target for attack. U-30 spotted the convoy and fired one torpedo at Gulflight, before noticing that she was flying an American flag. The submarine then broke off the attack in accordance with her instructions not to attack neutral vessels.

Gulflight survived the attack, although two members of the crew drowned while evacuating the ship and the master Captain Gunter died later that night from a heart attack. The ship was towed to Crow Bay and later repaired. News of the event would be overshadowed a few days later by the sinking of RMS Lusitania but the incident, together with the attack on Lusitania and another ship, Cushing, formed the basis of a formal complaint from the US government to Germany. Although the United States remained officially neutral in the ongoing hostilities, it reached agreement with the German government that further attacks by submarine would be strictly in accordance with "cruiser Rules" as defined by international law.

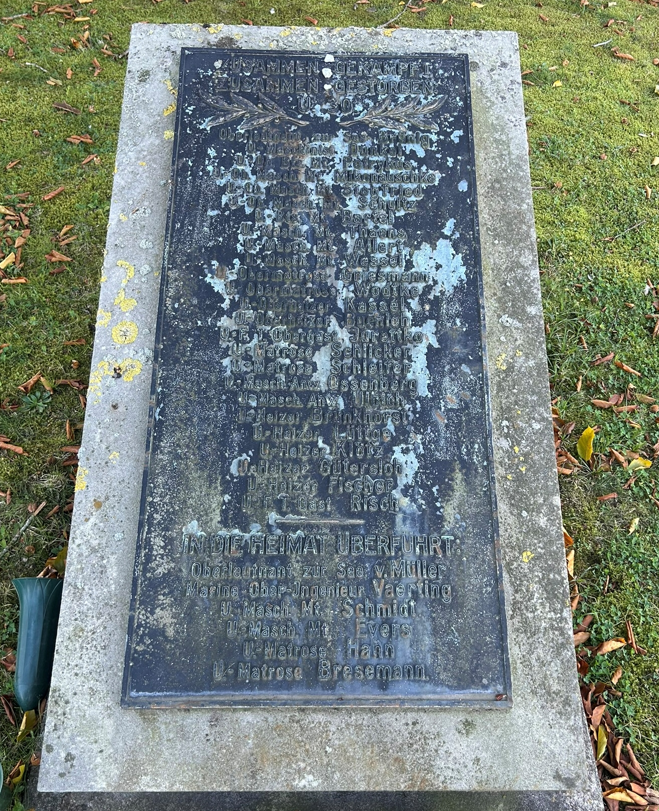
Gedenktafel für die aus U30 geborgenen Gefallenen auf dem Ehrenfriedhof in Emden

== Summary of raiding history ==
| Date | Name | Nationality | Tonnage (Note: Tonnages are in gross register tons) | Fate |
|---|---|---|---|---|
| 20 February 1915 | Cambank | United Kingdom | 3,112 | Sunk |
| 20 February 1915 | Downshire | United Kingdom | 337 | Sunk |
| 28 April 1915 | Mobile | United Kingdom | 1,905 | Sunk |
| 29 April 1915 | Cherbury | United Kingdom | 3,220 | Sunk |
| 30 April 1915 | Fulgent | United Kingdom | 2,008 | Sunk |
| 30 April 1915 | Svorono | Russian Empire | 3,102 | Sunk |
| 1 May 1915 | Edale | United Kingdom | 3,110 | Sunk |
| 1 May 1915 | Europe | France | 1,887 | Sunk |
| 1 May 1915 | Gulflight | United States | 5,189 | Damaged |
| 3 May 1915 | Minterne | United Kingdom | 3,018 | Sunk |
| 26 October 1916 | Lysland | Norway | 1,745 | Sunk |
| 1 November 1916 | Brierley Hill | United Kingdom | 1,168 | Sunk |
| 11 April 1917 | Saxo | Denmark | 711 | Sunk |
| 11 April 1917 | Nancy | Denmark | 1,325 | Sunk |
| 11 April 1917 | Star | Norway | 818 | Sunk |
| 11 April 1917 | Sylfiden | Norway | 796 | Sunk |
| 12 April 1917 | Kolaastind | Norway | 2,368 | Sunk |
| 13 April 1917 | Bokn | Norway | 336 | Sunk |
| 13 April 1917 | Frixos | Finland | 2,471 | Sunk |
| 13 April 1917 | Gama | Norway | 107 | Sunk |
| 13 April 1917 | Glenlora | Norway | 805 | Sunk |
| 13 April 1917 | Zara | United Kingdom | 1,331 | Sunk |
| 14 April 1917 | Fjeldli | Norway | 954 | Sunk |
| 15 April 1917 | Paris | Norway | 1,634 | Sunk |
| 16 May 1917 | Middlesex | United Kingdom | 7,265 | Sunk |
| 23 May 1917 | Freden | Denmark | 166 | Sunk |
| 16 July 1917 | Cyrus | Russian Empire | 293 | Sunk |
| 28 July 1917 | Atlas | France | 2,068 | Sunk |

== Bibliography ==
- Gröner, Erich; Jung, Dieter; Maass, Martin (1991). U-boats and Mine Warfare Vessels. German Warships 1815–1945. Vol. 2. Translated by Thomas, Keith; Magowan, Rachel. London: Conway Maritime Press. ISBN 0-85177-593-4.
