= SM U-39 =

German Type U 31 U-boat

History

German Empire
- Name: U-39
- Ordered: 12 June 1912
- Builder: Germaniawerft, Kiel
- Yard number: 199
- Laid down: 27 March 1913
- Launched: 26 September 1914
- Commissioned: 13 January 1915
- Fate: Surrendered 22 March 1919, broken up 1923.

General characteristics
- Class & type: Type U 31 submarine
- Displacement: 685 t (674 long tons) (surfaced); 878 t (864 long tons) (submerged)
- Length: 64.40 m (211 ft 3 in) (o/a); 52.36 m (171 ft 9 in) (pressure hull)
- Beam: 6.32 m (20 ft 9 in) (o/a); 4.05 m (13 ft 3 in) (pressure hull)
- Draught: 3.56 m (11 ft 8 in)
- Installed power: 2 × 1,850 PS (1,361 kW; 1,825 shp) diesel engines; 2 × 1,200 PS (883 kW; 1,184 shp) Doppelmodyn
- Propulsion: 2 × shafts; 2 × 1.60 m (5 ft 3 in) propellers
- Speed: 16.7 knots (30.9 km/h; 19.2 mph) (surfaced); 9.7 knots (18.0 km/h; 11.2 mph) (submerged)
- Range: 8,790 nmi (16,280 km; 10,120 mi) at 8 knots (15 km/h; 9.2 mph) (surfaced); 80 nmi (150 km; 92 mi) at 5 knots (9.3 km/h; 5.8 mph) (submerged)
- Test depth: 50 m (164 ft 1 in)
- Boats & landing craft carried: 1 dinghy
- Complement: 4 officers, 31 enlisted
- Armament: four 50 cm (20 in) torpedo tubes (2 each bow and stern); 6 torpedoes; one 8.8 cm (3.5 in) SK L/30 deck gun 10.5 cm (4.1 in) SK L/45 from 1916/17)

Service record
- Part of: II Flotilla; Unknown start – 15 September 1915; Pola / Mittelmeer / Mittelmeer I Flotilla; 15 September 1915 – 18 May 1918
- Commanders: Kptlt. Hans Kratzsch; 13 January – 9 February 1915; Kptlt. Walther Forstmann; 11 February 1915 – 14 October 1917; Kptlt. Heinrich Metzger; 15 October 1917 – 18 May 1918
- Operations: 19 patrols
- Victories: 149 merchant ships sunk (404,774 GRT); 3 warships sunk (1,364 tons); 2 auxiliary warships sunk (187 GRT); 7 merchant ships damaged (30,552 GRT); 1 merchant ship taken as prize (798 GRT)

SM U-39 was a German Type U 31 U-boat which operated in the Mediterranean Sea during World War I. It ended up being the second most successful U-boat participating in the war, sinking 149 merchant ships for a total of 404,774 GRT.

Its longest-serving captain was Kapitänleutnant Walther Forstmann, who was awarded the Pour le Mérite during command on U-39.

From January to mid-1917, Martin Niemöller served as U-39's coxswain. He is known as the author of the 1946 poem "First they came..."; as an enemy of the Third Reich, he was imprisoned from 1938 to 1945. In 1917 and 1918, Karl Dönitz served as watch officer on this boat. He later became Grand Admiral and Commander in Chief of the German Navy, and, for three weeks following Hitler's death, the head of the remnants of the Nazi government.

== Design ==
Type U 31 submarines were double-hulled ocean-going submarines similar to Type 23 and Type 27 subs in dimensions and differed only slightly in propulsion and speed. They were considered very good high sea boats with average manoeuvrability and good surface steering.

U-39 had an overall length of 64.70 m (212 ft 3 in), her pressure hull was 52.36 m (171 ft 9 in) long. The boat's beam was 6.32 m (20 ft 9 in) (o/a), while the pressure hull measured 4.05 m (13 ft 3 in). Type 31s had a draught of 3.56 m (11 ft 8 in) with a total height of 7.68–8.04 m (25 ft 2 in – 26 ft 5 in). The boats displaced a total of 971 tonnes (956 long tons); 685 t (674 long tons) when surfaced and 878 t (864 long tons) when submerged.

U-39 was fitted with two Germania 6-cylinder two-stroke diesel engines with a total of 1,850 metric horsepower (1,361 kW; 1,825 bhp) for use on the surface and two Siemens-Schuckert double-acting electric motors with a total of 1,200 PS (883 kW; 1,184 shp) for underwater use. These engines powered two shafts each with a 1.60 m (5 ft 3 in) propeller, which gave the boat a top surface speed of 16.4 knots (30.4 km/h; 18.9 mph), and 9.7 knots (18.0 km/h; 11.2 mph) when submerged. Cruising range was 8,790 nautical miles (16,280 km; 10,120 mi) at 8 knots (15 km/h; 9.2 mph) on the surface, and 80 nmi (150 km; 92 mi) at 5 knots (9.3 km/h; 5.8 mph) under water. Diving depth was 50 m (164 ft 1 in).

The U-boat was armed with four 50 cm (20 in) torpedo tubes, two fitted in the bow and two in the stern, and carried 6 torpedoes. Additionally U-39 was equipped in 1915 with one 8.8 cm (3.5 in) Uk L/30 deck gun, which was replaced with a 10.5 cm (4.1 in) in 1916/17. The boat's complement was 4 officers and 31 enlisted.

== Fate ==
On 27 April 1918, U-39 sailed from Pola under command of Kapitänleutnant Heinrich Metzger, for operations in the Western Mediterranean. On 17 May, together with SM UB-50, U-39 operated against a convoy North of Oran, from which it sank the British steamer Sculptor (4,874 GRT) in a submerged attack.

At 13:50 on 18 May, when in a position 36°36′N 00°02′W, U-39 was attacked by two French seaplanes. It crash-dived, but when reaching a depth of 12 meters two bombs exploded very close; the after torpedo room flooded, the diving planes were destroyed, and the boat began sinking by the stern. Kptlt. Metzger ordered the tanks blown and U-39 surfaced, but the heavy damage suffered prevented diving again. Metzger was forced to lay a course for the nearest Spanish harbour, Cartagena.

At about 17:00, U-39 was attacked again by two seaplanes; it fought back with gun and machine-guns, and the enemy bombs caused no damage, but during the action two crewmen (sailor Schulz and stoker Hausottl) fell overboard and were lost.

In the evening U-39 reached Cartagena and was interned for the remainder of the war.

It was surrendered to France on 22 March 1919 and was broken up at Toulon in 1923.

== Summary of raiding history ==
Date	Name	Nationality	Tonnage (Note: Merchant ship tonnages are in gross register tons. Military vessels are listed by tons displacement.)	Fate
1 May 1915	Balduin	Norway	1,059	Sunk
1 May 1915	Elsa	Sweden	120	Sunk
2 May 1915	St. Louis No. 1	United Kingdom	211	Sunk
2 May 1915	Sunray	United Kingdom	165	Sunk
3 May 1915	Scottish Queen	United Kingdom	125	Sunk
4 May 1915	Elsa	Sweden	329	Sunk
5 May 1915	Sceptre	United Kingdom	166	Sunk
6 May 1915	Truro	United Kingdom	836	Sunk
7 May 1915	Benington	United Kingdom	131	Sunk
10 May 1915	Olga	Denmark	798	Captured as prize
26 June 1915	Campania	United Kingdom	167	Sunk
29 June 1915	Cambuskenneth	Norway	1,924	Sunk
29 June 1915	Kotka	Norway	952	Damaged
30 June 1915	Lomas	United Kingdom	3,048	Sunk
1 July 1915	Caucasian	United Kingdom	4,656	Sunk
1 July 1915	Craigard	United Kingdom	3,286	Sunk
1 July 1915	Gadsby	United Kingdom	3,497	Sunk
1 July 1915	Inglemoor	United Kingdom	4,331	Sunk
1 July 1915	Richmond	United Kingdom	3,214	Sunk
2 July 1915	Hirondelle	France	183	Sunk
2 July 1915	Boduognat	Belgium	1,411	Sunk
2 July 1915	City of Edinburgh	United Kingdom	6,255	Damaged
3 July 1915	Fiery Cross	Norway	1,448	Sunk
3 July 1915	Larchmore	United Kingdom	4,355	Sunk
3 July 1915	Renfrew	United Kingdom	3,488	Sunk
4 July 1915	Anglo-Californian	United Kingdom	7,333	Damaged
2 September 1915	William T. Lewis	United Kingdom	2,166	Damaged
9 September 1915	Cornubia	United Kingdom	1,736	Sunk
9 September 1915	L’Aude	France	2,232	Sunk
9 September 1915	Ville De Mostaganem	France	2,648	Sunk
28 September 1915	H. C. Henry	Canada	4,219	Sunk
29 September 1915	Haydn	United Kingdom	3,923	Sunk
30 September 1915	Cirene	Kingdom of Italy	3,236	Sunk
2 October 1915	Sailor Prince	United Kingdom	3,144	Sunk
7 October 1915	Halizones	United Kingdom	5,093	Sunk
8 October 1915	Thorpwood	United Kingdom	3,184	Sunk
9 October 1915	Apollo	United Kingdom	3,774	Sunk
12 October 1915	HMD Restore	Royal Navy	93	Sunk
30 November 1915	Middleton	United Kingdom	2,506	Sunk
3 December 1915	Dante	Kingdom of Italy	889	Sunk
3 December 1915	Helmsmuir	United Kingdom	4,111	Sunk
5 December 1915	Petrolite	United States	3,710	Damaged
5 December 1915	Pietro Lofaro	Kingdom of Italy	517	Sunk
6 December 1915	L. G. Goulandris	Greece	2,123	Sunk
7 December 1915	Veria	United Kingdom	3,229	Sunk
9 December 1915	Busiris	United Kingdom	2,705	Sunk
9 December 1915	Orteric	United Kingdom	6,535	Sunk
10 December 1915	Porto Said	Kingdom of Italy	5,301	Sunk
18 December 1915	HMD Lottie Leask	Royal Navy	94	Sunk
22 January 1916	Norseman	United Kingdom	9,542	Sunk
31 March 1916	Egeo	Kingdom of Italy	1,787	Sunk
31 March 1916	Riposto	Kingdom of Italy	1,003	Sunk
2 April 1916	Simla	United Kingdom	5,884	Sunk
3 April 1916	Clan Campbell	United Kingdom	5,897	Sunk
4 April 1916	Giuseppe Padre	Kingdom of Italy	184	Sunk
4 April 1916	Maria Carmella Findari	Kingdom of Italy	42	Sunk
6 April 1916	Stjerneborg	Denmark	1,592	Sunk
6 April 1916	Colbert	France	5,394	Damaged
9 April 1916	Caledonia	Denmark	1,815	Sunk
13 April 1916	Lipari	Kingdom of Italy	1,539	Sunk
20 May 1916	Redentore	Kingdom of Italy	228	Sunk
20 May 1916	Valsesia	Kingdom of Italy	248	Sunk
21 May 1916	Birmania	Kingdom of Italy	2,384	Sunk
21 May 1916	Rosalia Madre	Kingdom of Italy	251	Sunk
23 May 1916	Hercules	Kingdom of Italy	2,704	Sunk
23 May 1916	Maria Porto Di Salvezza	Kingdom of Italy	39	Sunk
23 May 1916	Teresa Accame	Kingdom of Italy	4,742	Damaged
23 May 1916	Washington	Kingdom of Italy	2,819	Sunk
24 May 1916	Aurrera	Spain	2,845	Sunk
25 May 1916	Fratelli Bandiera	Kingdom of Italy	3,506	Sunk
25 May 1916	Rita	Kingdom of Italy	200	Sunk
27 May 1916	Mar Terso	Kingdom of Italy	3,778	Sunk
27 May 1916	Trunkby	United Kingdom	2,635	Sunk
28 May 1916	Lady Ninian	United Kingdom	4,297	Sunk
29 May 1916	Baron Vernon	United Kingdom	1,779	Sunk
29 May 1916	Elmgrove	United Kingdom	3,018	Sunk
29 May 1916	Southgarth	United Kingdom	2,414	Sunk
30 May 1916	Baron Tweedmouth	United Kingdom	5,007	Sunk
30 May 1916	Dalegarth	United Kingdom	2,265	Sunk
30 May 1916	Hermesberg	Kingdom of Italy	2,884	Sunk
30 May 1916	Rauma	Norway	3,047	Sunk
1 June 1916	Dewsland	United Kingdom	1,993	Sunk
1 June 1916	Salmonpool	United Kingdom	4,905	Sunk
13 July 1916	Silverton	United Kingdom	2,682	Sunk
14 July 1916	Antigua	United Kingdom	2,876	Sunk
14 July 1916	Ecclesia	United Kingdom	3,714	Sunk
15 July 1916	Sylvie	United Kingdom	1,354	Sunk
16 July 1916	Euphorbia	United Kingdom	3,837	Sunk
16 July 1916	Sirra	Kingdom of Italy	3,203	Sunk
16 July 1916	Wiltonhall	United Kingdom	3,387	Sunk
17 July 1916	Angelo	Kingdom of Italy	3,609	Sunk
17 July 1916	Rosemoor	United Kingdom	4,303	Sunk
18 July 1916	Llongwen	United Kingdom	4,683	Sunk
20 July 1916	Cettois	France	974	Sunk
20 July 1916	Grangemoor	United Kingdom	3,198	Sunk
20 July 1916	Karma	United Kingdom	3,710	Sunk
20 July 1916	Yzer	United Kingdom	3,538	Sunk
21 July 1916	Wolf	United Kingdom	2,443	Sunk
22 July 1916	Knutsford	United Kingdom	3,842	Sunk
22 July 1916	Olive	United Kingdom	3,678	Sunk
23 July 1916	Badminton	United Kingdom	3,847	Sunk
24 July 1916	Maria	Kingdom of Italy	198	Sunk
29 July 1916	Letimbro	Kingdom of Italy	2,210	Sunk
29 July 1916	Rosarina G.V.	Kingdom of Italy	131	Sunk
19 October 1916	Penylan	United Kingdom	3,875	Sunk
20 October 1916	Mombassa	United Kingdom	4,689	Sunk
22 October 1916	Cluden	United Kingdom	3,166	Sunk
22 October 1916	Nina	Kingdom of Italy	3,383	Sunk
22 October 1916	Ravn	Norway	998	Sunk
22 October 1916	W. Harkess	United Kingdom	1,185	Sunk
27 November 1916	Margarita	Greece	1,112	Sunk
27 November 1916	Reapwell	United Kingdom	3,417	Sunk
28 November 1916	King Malcolm	United Kingdom	4,351	Sunk
28 November 1916	Moresby	United Kingdom	1,763	Sunk
2 December 1916	Istrar	United Kingdom	4,582	Sunk
3 December 1916	Plata	Kingdom of Italy	1,861	Sunk
9 January 1917	Baynesk	United Kingdom	3,286	Sunk
15 January 1917	Garfield	United Kingdom	3,838	Sunk
28 January 1917	Amiral Magon	France	5,566	Sunk, 203 people killed
14 February 1917	Torino	Kingdom of Italy	4,159	Sunk
15 February 1917	Minas	Kingdom of Italy	2,854	Sunk, 870 people killed
17 February 1917	Ala	Kingdom of Italy	359	Sunk
20 February 1917	Rosalie	United Kingdom	4,237	Sunk
21 February 1917	Wathfield	United Kingdom	3,012	Sunk
22 February 1917	Ville De Bougie	France	508	Sunk
23 February 1917	Trojan Prince	United Kingdom	3,196	Sunk
26 February 1917	Burnby	United Kingdom	3,665	Sunk
3 March 1917	S. Anna S.	Kingdom of Italy	41	Sunk
3 June 1917	Petronilla Madre	Kingdom of Italy	43	Sunk
6 June 1917	Diane	France	590	Sunk
8 June 1917	Huntstrick	United Kingdom	8,151	Sunk
8 June 1917	Isle Of Jura	United Kingdom	3,809	Sunk
8 June 1917	HMML 540	Royal Navy	37	Sunk
8 June 1917	HMML 541	Royal Navy	37	Sunk
8 June 1917	Valdieri	Kingdom of Italy	4,637	Sunk
10 June 1917	Petrolite	United States	3,710	Sunk
11 June 1917	Wera	Russian Empire	476	Sunk
12 June 1917	Gaita	Russian Empire	396	Sunk
15 June 1917	Espinho	Portugal	740	Sunk
19 June 1917	Kyma	Greece	3,420	Sunk
20 June 1917	Eli Lindoe	Norway	1,116	Sunk
22 June 1917	Toro	Uruguay	1,141	Sunk
23 June 1917	Isere	France	2,159	Sunk
29 July 1917	Manchester Commerce	United Kingdom	4,144	Sunk
30 July 1917	Carlo	Kingdom of Italy	5,572	Sunk
30 July 1917	Ganges	United Kingdom	4,177	Sunk
31 July 1917	Carolvore	Norway	1,659	Sunk
31 July 1917	Ypres	United Kingdom	305	Sunk
3 August 1917	Halldor	Norway	2,919	Sunk
5 August 1917	Ryton	United Kingdom	3,991	Sunk
27 September 1917	Swan River	United Kingdom	4,724	Sunk
1 October 1917	Mersario	United Kingdom	3,847	Sunk
1 October 1917	Normanton	United Kingdom	3,862	Sunk
2 October 1917	Almora	United Kingdom	4,385	Sunk
2 October 1917	Hikosan Maru	Japan	3,555	Sunk
2 October 1917	Nuceria	United Kingdom	4,702	Sunk
14 November 1917	Buenaventura	Spain	257	Sunk
18 November 1917	HMS Candytuft	Royal Navy	1,290	Sunk
21 November 1917	Schuylkill	United States	2,720	Sunk
23 November 1917	Markella	Greece	1,124	Sunk
25 November 1917	Karema	United Kingdom	5,263	Sunk
17 May 1918	Sculptor	United Kingdom	4,874	Sunk

== Bibliography ==
- Gröner, Erich; Jung, Dieter; Maass, Martin (1991). U-boats and Mine Warfare Vessels. German Warships 1815–1945. Vol. 2. Translated by Thomas, Keith; Magowan, Rachel. London: Conway Maritime Press. ISBN 0-85177-593-4.
