= SS Chancellor =

Sunken British cargo ship

- Chancellor.

History
- Name: (United Kingdom) SS Saint Cuthbert (1895–1902); (United Kingdom) SS Chancellor (1902–1915)
- Owner: Harrison T. & J. Ltd. - Charente S.S. Co.
- Port of registry: Newcastle upon Tyne, United Kingdom
- Builder: C. S. Swan & Hunter Ltd.
- Yard number: 197
- Launched: 9 May 1895
- Completed: 12 September 1895
- Identification: 105336
- Fate: Shelled and sunk 23 September 1915

General characteristics
- Type: Cargo ship
- Tonnage: 4,586 GRT
- Length: 122 metres (400 ft 3 in)
- Beam: 14.3 metres (46 ft 11 in)
- Installed power: Triple expansion steam engine
- Propulsion: Screw propeller

SS Chancellor was a British cargo ship that was shelled and sunk by SM U-41 in the Atlantic Ocean 86 nautical miles (159 km; 99 mi) south by east of the Fastnet Rock, while she was travelling from Liverpool to New Orleans.

== Construction ==
Chancellor was constructed in 1895 with yard no. 197 at the Swan Hunter shipyard in Newcastle upon Tyne. She was completed in 1895 and sailed under the name Saint Cuthbert until 1902. She was renamed Chancellor in 1902.

The ship was 122 metres (400 ft 3 in) long, with a beam of 14.3 metres (46 ft 11 in). The ship was assessed at 4,586 GRT. She had a triple expansion steam engine driving a single screw propeller. The engine was rated at 418 nhp.

== Sinking ==
On 23 September 1915, Chancellor was on a voyage from Liverpool to New Orleans with 2500 tons of general cargo, until the ship was captured and shelled by SM U-41. The ship sank with no loss of life in the Atlantic Ocean 86 nautical miles (159 km; 99 mi) south by east of the Fastnet Rock.
