= List of shipwrecks in May 1915 =

The list of shipwrecks in May 1915 includes ships sunk, foundered, grounded, or otherwise lost during May 1915.

== 1 May ==
List of shipwrecks: 1 May 1915
Ship	State	Description
SMS A2	Imperial German Navy	World War I: Action off Noordhinder Bank. The A1-class torpedo boat was shelled and sunk in the North Sea by HMS Laforey, HMS Lark, HMS Lawford and HMS Leonidas (all Royal Navy).
SMS A6	Imperial German Navy	World War I: Action off Noordhinder Bank. The A1-class torpedo boat was shelled and sunk in the North Sea by HMS Laforey, HMS Lark, HMS Lawford and HMS Leonidas (all Royal Navy).
Balduin	Norway	World War I: The cargo ship was sunk in the North Sea (56°58′N 3°15′E) by SM U-39 (Imperial German Navy). Her crew survived.
HMT Columbia	Royal Navy	World War I: Action off Noordhinder Bank. The naval trawler was torpedoed and sunk in the North Sea off the Noord Hinder Lightship (Netherlands) by two German torpedo boats. Three of her crew were rescued by one of the torpedo boats, both of which were subsequently sunk by HMS Laforey, HMS Lark, HMS Lawford and HMS Leonidas (all Royal Navy).
Edale	United Kingdom	World War I: The cargo ship was torpedoed and sunk in the Atlantic Ocean 45 nautical miles (83 km) north west by north of the Isles of Scilly (50°09′N 7°30′W) by SM U-30 (Imperial German Navy). Her 24 crew survived.
Elsa	Sweden	World War I: The sailing vessel was sunk in the North Sea 100 nautical miles (190 km) east of the Isle of May, Fife, United Kingdom by SM U-39 (Imperial German Navy). Her crew survived.
Europe	France	World War I: The cargo ship was captured by, and sunk by gunfire from, SM U-30 (Imperial German Navy) in the Atlantic Ocean 3 nautical miles (5.6 km) north west of the Bishop's Rock (49°54′N 6°30′W). Her crew survived.
Joule	French Navy	World War I: Gallipoli campaign: The Brumaire-class submarine struck a mine and sank in the Dardanelles with the loss of all hands.
Gulflight	United States	World War I: The tanker was torpedoed and damaged in the Atlantic Ocean 20 nautical miles (37 km) west of the Isles of Scilly by SM U-30 (Imperial German Navy) with the loss of three crew and was beached. She was subsequently repaired and returned to service.
HMS Recruit	Royal Navy	World War I: The C-class destroyer was torpedoed and sunk in the North Sea 30 nautical miles (56 km) south west of the Galloper Lightship (United Kingdom) by SM UB-6 (Imperial German Navy) with the loss of 34 of her crew.

== 2 May ==
List of shipwrecks: 2 May 1915
Ship	State	Description
America	Norway	World War I: The cargo ship was sunk in the North Sea 200 nautical miles (370 km) off Bergen, Norway (57°20′N 1°09′W) by SM U-41 (Imperial German Navy). Her 39 crew were rescued by Sterling (Norway).
Cruiser	United Kingdom	World War I: The trawler was shelled and sunk in the North Sea 50 nautical miles (93 km) south east of Aberdeen by SM U-41 (Imperial German Navy) with the loss of four of her eleven crew. The survivors were rescued by T. W. Stewart (United Kingdom).
Ellida	Sweden	World War I: The cargo ship was reported to have been torpedoed and sunk in the North Sea by a German submarine. All eighteen people on board were rescued by Jeno (Denmark).
Martaban	United Kingdom	World War I: The 103.7-foot (31.6 m), 148-ton steam trawler was shelled and sunk in the North Sea 22 nautical miles (41 km) east of Aberdeen by SM U-41 (Imperial German Navy). Her crew survived, rowing to shore in 17 hours.
Mercury	United Kingdom	World War I: The trawler was shelled and sunk in the North Sea 14 nautical miles (26 km) east by north of Girdleness, Aberdeenshire by SM U-41 (Imperial German Navy). Her crew survived.
Sintram	United States	During a voyage from San Francisco, California, to Naknek, Territory of Alaska, with 105 cannery employees, a crew of 74, and a cargo of 1,400 tons of salmon cannery supplies aboard, the 1,656-gross register ton, 215.4-foot (65.7 m) wooden ship was wrecked in fog without loss of life on the coast of the Alaska Peninsula 7 nautical miles (13 km; 8.1 mi) northwest of the mouth of the Egegik River, becoming a total loss. The steamer Kadiak took off her crew on 3 May.
St. George	United Kingdom	World War I: The trawler was shelled and sunk in the North Sea 65 nautical miles (120 km) east of Aberdeen by SM U-41 (Imperial German Navy). Her crew survived but were taken as prisoners of war.
St. Louis No.1	United Kingdom	World War I: The trawler was shelled and sunk in the North Sea 60 nautical miles (110 km) east by north of the Isle of May, Fife by SM U-39 (Imperial German Navy). Her crew survived.
Sunray	United Kingdom	World War I: The trawler was shelled and sunk in the North Sea 56 nautical miles (104 km) north by east of the Longstone Lighthouse by SM U-39 (Imperial German Navy). Her crew survived.

== 3 May ==
List of shipwrecks: 3 May 1915
Ship	State	Description
Bob White	United Kingdom	World War I: The trawler was shelled and sunk in the North Sea 125 nautical miles (232 km) east of Spurn Point, Yorkshire by SM U-9 (Imperial German Navy). Her crew were rescued by the trawler Leonardo (United Kingdom).
Coquet	United Kingdom	World War I: The trawler was captured and scuttled in the North Sea 160 nautical miles (300 km) east north east of Spurn Point by SM U-9 (Imperial German Navy). Her nine crew were rescued by the trawler Etruscan (United Kingdom).
Gul Djemal	Ottoman Empire	The troopship was torpedoed and sunk in the Sea of Marmara by HMS E14 (Royal Navy). Later salvaged, repaired and returned to service.
Hector	United Kingdom	World War I: The trawler was shelled and sunk in the North Sea 160 nautical miles (300 km) east north east of Spurn Point by SM U-9 (Imperial German Navy). Her nine crew were rescued by the trawler Etruscan (United Kingdom).
Hero	United Kingdom	World War I: The trawler was captured and scuttled in the North Sea 150 nautical miles (280 km) east north east of Hornsea, Yorkshire by SM U-9 (Imperial German Navy). Her crew were rescued by the trawler Leonardo (United Kingdom).
Iolanthe	United Kingdom	World War I: The trawler was captured and scuttled in the North Sea 140 nautical miles (260 km) east north east of Hornsea by SM U-9 (Imperial German Navy). Her crew were rescued by the trawler Leonardo (United Kingdom).
Martaban	United Kingdom	World War I: The trawler was reported to have been sunk in the North Sea off Aberdeen by a German submarine.
Mercury	United Kingdom	World War I: The trawler was reported to have been sunk in the North Sea off Aberdeen by a German submarine.
Minterne	United Kingdom	World War I: The cargo ship was torpedoed and sunk in the Atlantic Ocean 50 nautical miles (93 km) south west of the Wolf Rock by SM U-30 (Imperial German Navy) with the loss of two or her 25 crew. The survivors were rescued by two fishing vessels.
Northward Ho	United Kingdom	World War I: The trawler was captured and scuttled in the North Sea 125 nautical miles (232 km) east north east of Hornsea by SM U-9 (Imperial German Navy). Her crew were rescued by the trawler Leonardo (United Kingdom).
Oscar	Norway	World War I: The sailing vessel was sunk in the North Sea south west of Lindesnes, Lister og Mandal county, Norway (56°55′N 4°20′E) by SM U-41 (Imperial German Navy). Her crew were rescued by the trawler Leonardo (United Kingdom).
Progress	United Kingdom	World War I: The trawler was captured and scuttled in the North Sea 155 nautical miles (287 km) east north east of Spurn Point by SM U-9 (Imperial German Navy). Her eleven crew were rescued by the trawler Etruscan (United Kingdom).
Scottish Queen	United Kingdom	World War I: The trawler was shelled and sunk in the North Sea 50 nautical miles (93 km) east south east of Aberdeen by SM U-39 (Imperial German Navy). Her crew survived.
Uxbridge	United Kingdom	World War I: The trawler caught a mine in her nets and was sunk when it exploded. All nine crew were rescued by another trawler.
Vanadis	Sweden	World War I: The coaster was sunk off Fehmarn in the Baltic Sea after a collision with SMS Silvana (Imperial German Navy). Her crew survived.

== 4 May ==
List of shipwrecks: 4 May 1915
Ship	State	Description
Elsa	Sweden	World War I: The schooner was sunk in the North Sea south east of Peterhead, Aberdeenshire, United Kingdom by SM U-39 (Imperial German Navy). Her five crew were rescued by Sernebo (Sweden).
Rugby	United Kingdom	World War I: The trawler was captured and scuttled in the North Sea 100 nautical miles (190 km) east north east of the Spurn Lightship (United Kingdom) by SM U-9 (Imperial German Navy). Her crew survived.

== 5 May ==
List of shipwrecks: 5 May 1915
Ship	State	Description
Cathay	Denmark	World War I: The cargo ship was sunk in the North Sea either by striking a mine or by being torpedoed. All 43 people on board survived.
Earl of Lathom	United Kingdom	World War I: The three-masted schooner was torpedoed and sunk in the Atlantic Ocean 8 nautical miles (15 km) south west of Kinsale, County Cork by SM U-20 (Imperial German Navy). Her five crew were rescued by a drifter.
Sceptre	United Kingdom	World War I: The fishing vessel was shelled and sunk in the North Sea 40 nautical miles (74 km) south east by south of Peterhead, Aberdeenshire by SM U-39 (Imperial German Navy). Her crew survived.
Straton	United Kingdom	World War I: The trawler was shelled and sunk in the North Sea 40 nautical miles (74 km) east of Hartlepool, County Durham by SM U-9 (Imperial German Navy). Her crew were rescued by the trawler Loch Katrine (United Kingdom).

== 6 May ==
List of shipwrecks: 6 May 1915
Ship	State	Description
Candidate	United Kingdom	World War I: The cargo ship was torpedoed and sunk in St. George's Channel 13 nautical miles (24 km) south by east of the Coningbeg Lightship (United Kingdom) by SM U-20 (Imperial German Navy). Her crew survived.
Centurion	United Kingdom	World War I: The cargo ship was torpedoed and sunk in St. George's Channel 20 nautical miles (37 km) south of the Coningbeg Lightship (United Kingdom) by SM U-20 (Imperial German Navy). Her crew survived.
Don	United Kingdom	World War I: The trawler struck a mine and sank in the North Sea 100 nautical miles (190 km) east by south of Spurn Point, Yorkshire with the loss of seven of her crew.
Merrie Islington	United Kingdom	World War I: The trawler was captured and scuttled in the North Sea 6 nautical miles (11 km) north north east of Whitby, Yorkshire by SM U-9 (Imperial German Navy). Her nine crew survived.
Truro	United Kingdom	World War I: The passenger ship was torpedoed and sunk in the North Sea 85 nautical miles (157 km) east north east of St Abb's Head, Berwickshire by SM U-39 (Imperial German Navy). Her twenty crew were rescued by Tanjeu (Norway).
Ward #17	United States	The scow stranded near Watch Hill, Rhode Island.

== 7 May ==
List of shipwrecks: 7 May 1915
Ship	State	Description			
Benington	United Kingdom	World War I: The trawler was shelled and sunk in the North Sea 180 nautical miles (330 km) south east of Peterhead, Aberdeenshire by SM U-39 (Imperial German Navy). Her crew survived. {{shipwreck list item	ship=Lusitania	flag=United Kingdom	desc= RMS Lusitania. World War I: Sinking of the RMS Lusitania: The ocean liner was torpedoed and sunk in the Irish Sea off the Old Head of Kinsale, County Cork by SM U-20 (Imperial German Navy) with the loss of 1,197 of the 1,960 people on board.
HMS Maori	Royal Navy	World War I: The Tribal-class destroyer struck a mine and sank in the North Sea off Zeebrugge, West Flanders, Belgium.			

== 8 May ==
List of shipwrecks: 8 May 1915
Ship	State	Description
Don	United Kingdom	World War I: The collier was torpedoed and sunk in the North Sea 7 nautical miles (13 km) east of Coquet Island by SM U-9 (Imperial German Navy). Her crew survived.
Hellenic	United Kingdom	World War I: The trawler struck a mine and sank in the North Sea with the loss of three of her nine crew.
Lilian Drost	Denmark	World War I: The cargo ship was sunk in the North Sea (56°40′N 4°00′E) by SM U-36 (Imperial German Navy). Her crew survived.
Queen Wilhelmina	United Kingdom	World War I: The cargo ship was torpedoed and damaged in the North Sea off the Longstone Lighthouse by SM U-9 (Imperial German Navy). She was beached at Amble, Northumberland and was a total loss.

== 9 May ==
List of shipwrecks: 9 May 1915
Ship	State	Description
Junior	United States	The steamer struck the breakwater at Cleveland, Ohio and sank. Six crew were killed.

== 12 May ==
List of shipwrecks: 12 May 1915
Ship	State	Description
HMS Goliath	Royal Navy	World War I: Naval operations in the Dardanelles Campaign: The Canopus-class battleship was torpedoed and sunk by Muâvenet-i Millîye (Ottoman Navy) in the Dardanelles with the loss of 570 of her 700 crew.

== 15 May ==
List of shipwrecks: 15 May 1915
Ship	State	Description
HMT Berkshire	Royal Navy	The naval trawler was lost on this date.
Martha	Denmark	World War I: The cargo ship was sunk in the North Sea 2 nautical miles (3.7 km) off Gregness, Aberdeenshire, United Kingdom by SM U-23 (Imperial German Navy). Her crew survived.

== 16 May ==
List of shipwrecks: 16 May 1915
Ship	State	Description
SMS T78	Imperial German Navy	World War I: The S66-class torpedo boat struck a mine and sank in the North Sea with the loss of 26 of her crew.

== 18 May ==
List of shipwrecks: 18 May 1915
Ship	State	Description
Drumcree	United Kingdom	World War I: The cargo ship was torpedoed and sunk in the Atlantic Ocean 11 nautical miles (20 km) north by east of Trevose Head, Cornwall (50°41′N 5°00′W) by SM U-27 (Imperial German Navy). Her crew survived.
SMS V150	Imperial German Navy	The S138-class destroyer collided with SMS V157 (Imperial German Navy) and sank in the Jade Bight with the loss of 60 of her crew.

== 19 May ==
List of shipwrecks: 19 May 1915
Ship	State	Description
Chrysolite	United Kingdom	World War I: The trawler was scuttled in the North Sea 25 nautical miles (46 km) south west by south of Lerwick, Shetland Islands by SM U-23 (Imperial German Navy). Her crew survived.
Crimond	United Kingdom	World War I: The trawler was sunk in the Atlantic Ocean 50 nautical miles (93 km) south west of Fair Isle by SM U-23 (Imperial German Navy). Her crew survived.
Dumfries	United Kingdom	World War I: The cargo ship was torpedoed and sunk in the Atlantic Ocean 13 nautical miles (24 km) north of Trevose Head, Cornwall by SM U-27 (Imperial German Navy) with the loss of two of her crew.
Lucerne	United Kingdom	World War I: The 106-foot (32 m), 154-ton steam trawler was captured and scuttled in the North Sea 50 nautical miles (93 km) north east by east of Rattray Head, Aberdeenshire by SM U-23 (Imperial German Navy). Her crew was rescued by "Urda" (Denmark).

== 20 May ==
List of shipwrecks: 20 May 1915
Ship	State	Description
Scow #5	United States	The scow sank at Rogers Island, Stony Creek, Connecticut.

== 21 May ==
List of shipwrecks: 21 May 1915
Ship	State	Description
Angelo	United Kingdom	World War I: The trawler struck a mine and sank in the North Sea off the Dogger Bank.
George Hudson	United States	The fishing steamer became disabled and was stranded off Point Judith, Rhode Island.
Glenholm	United Kingdom	World War I: The full-rigged ship was torpedoed and sunk in the Atlantic Ocean 16 nautical miles (30 km) west south west of the Fastnet Rock by SM U-27 (Imperial German Navy). Her crew survived.
Oceaan	Netherlands	The schooner collided with Voltaire (United Kingdom) in the Atlantic Ocean off the Longships Lighthouse and sank.
Sabrina	United Kingdom	World War I: The trawler struck a mine and sank in the North Sea 160 nautical miles (300 km) east north east of the Spurn Lightship (United Kingdom) with the loss of nine of her crew.

== 22 May ==
List of shipwrecks: 22 May 1915
Ship	State	Description
Minerva	Norway	World War I: The cargo ship was sunk in the North Sea 30 nautical miles (56 km) east by north of the Farne Islands, Northumberland, United Kingdom (55°50′N 0°40′W) by SM U-23 (Imperial German Navy). Her crew survived.

== 23 May ==
List of shipwrecks: 23 May 1915
Ship	State	Description
Cromdale	United Kingdom	The full-rigged ship ran aground at Bass Point, Cornwall.
Hernodia	Sweden	World War I: The cargo ship, en route from Gothenburg to Härnösand on her first voyage, sank after a mine explosion in the Sea of Åland. No casualties.
Peleng-i Derya	Ottoman Navy	World War I: The Peleng-i Derya-class torpedo gunboat was torpedoed and sunk in shallow water off Istanbul by HMS E11 (Royal Navy).
SM UB-3	Imperial German Navy	The Type UB 1 submarine was lost in the Gulf of İzmir 80 nautical miles (150 km) off İzmir with the loss of all fourteen crew.

== 24 May ==
List of shipwrecks: 24 May 1915
Ship	State	Description
Claremont	United States	The coaster came ashore at Coos Bay, Oregon and was a total loss.
Turbine	Regia Marina	World War I: The Nembo-class destroyer was sunk in the Adriatic Sea by SMS Helgoland and two destroyers (all Austro-Hungarian Navy).

== 25 May ==
List of shipwrecks: 25 May 1915
Ship	State	Description
Rijndam	Netherlands	The ocean liner collided with Joseph J. Cuneo (Norway) in the Atlantic Ocean 10 nautical miles (19 km) south of the Nantucket Shoals, United States. Two hundred and thirty passengers were rescued by USS Louisiana, USS Michigan, USS South Carolina and USS Texas (all United States Navy). Rijndam was subsequently repaired and returned to service.
HMS Triumph	Royal Navy	World War I: Naval operations in the Dardanelles Campaign: The Swiftsure-class battleship was torpedoed and sunk in the Dardanelles by SM U-21 (Imperial German Navy) with the loss of 78 of her 803 crew. Survivors were rescued by HMS Chelmer (Royal Navy).

== 26 May ==
List of shipwrecks: 26 May 1915
Ship	State	Description
Betty	Denmark	World War I: The cargo ship was sunk in the North Sea 132 nautical miles (244 km) east of the Longstone Lighthouse by SM U-16 (Imperial German Navy). Her 22 crew were rescued by Waldemarand (Sweden).
Dredge No. 5	United States	The dredge sank at the Cold Storage Wharf, East Boston, Massachusetts.
Morwenna	United Kingdom	World War I: The cargo ship was shelled and sunk in the Atlantic Ocean 72 nautical miles (133 km) south east by east of the Fastnet Rock (50°27′N 8°44′W) by SM U-41 (Imperial German Navy) with the loss of a crew member. Survivors were rescued by the trawler Jacqueline (Belgium).
M. Roosval	Sweden	World War I: The barque was sunk in the North Sea east of the Shetland Islands, United Kingdom (56°53′N 2°30′E) by SM U-16 (Imperial German Navy) with the loss of two crew. Survivors were rescued by the trawler Tres Fratres (Netherlands).

== 27 May ==
List of shipwrecks: 27 May 1915
Ship	State	Description
Cadeby	United Kingdom	World War I: The cargo ship was shelled and sunk in the Atlantic Ocean 20 nautical miles (37 km; 23 mi) south west by south of the Wolf Rock Lighthouse (49°40′N 6°10′W) by SM U-41 (Imperial German Navy). Her crew survived.
Delta	United Kingdom	World War I: The cargo ship was scuttled off Forcados, Nigeria.
Elmer	Canada	The schooner was wrecked off Parker's Cove, Nova Scotia, in the Bay of Fundy.
Ely	Denmark	World War I: The cargo ship was sunk by a mine in the Baltic Sea.
Harry	Canada	The lumber schooner was abandoned 35 miles (56 km) south west of Cape Sable Island.
Lizzie J. Call	United States	The schooner stranded on Bartletts Reef, off New London, Connecticut.
HMS Majestic	Royal Navy	HMS Majestic World War I: Naval operations in the Dardanelles Campaign: The Majestic-class battleship was torpedoed and sunk by SM U-21 (Imperial German Navy) in the Dardanelles and sank with the loss of 49 of her 672 crew. Seven survivors were rescued by the trawler HMT Lord Wimborne (Royal Navy).
HMS Princess Irene	Royal Navy	World War I: The minelayer, a converted ocean liner, exploded and sank in the River Medway off Sheerness, Kent with the loss of 350 lives.
HMT Rolulu	Royal Navy	The naval trawler was wrecked on the Obb Rock, Isle of Lewis, Outer Hebrides.
Southward Ho	United Kingdom	World War I: The trawler was lost with all hands due to enemy action 88 miles (142 km) from Spurn Head.
Thomas C. Rackett	United States	The schooner sank near Plum Beach Light in Narragansett Bay.
Unknown barges	Royal Navy	World War I: The two tow barges were sunk by SM U-21 (Imperial German Navy) in the Dardanelles.
Winthrop	United States	The schooner barge foundered 15 miles (24 km) off Assateague.

== 28 May ==
List of shipwrecks: 28 May 1915
Ship	State	Description
Ethiope	United Kingdom	World War I: The cargo ship was torpedoed and sunk in the Atlantic Ocean (49°39′N 4°16′W) by SM U-41 (Imperial German Navy). Her 32 crew were rescued by Wiltshire (United Kingdom) and another vessel.
Mars	Russia	World War I: The sailing ship was sunk in the North Sea 40 nautical miles (74 km) east of the Shetland Islands, United Kingdom by SM U-16 (Imperial German Navy).
Spennymoor	United Kingdom	World War I: The collier was torpedoed and sunk in the Atlantic Ocean 50 nautical miles (93 km) south west of Start Point by SM U-41 (Imperial German Navy) with the loss of five crew.
Tullochmoor	United Kingdom	World War I: The cargo ship was shelled and sunk in the Atlantic Ocean 52 nautical miles (96 km) north of Ouessant, Finistère, France (49°19′N 5°21′W) by SM U-41 (Imperial German Navy). Her crew survived.
Yucatan	Mexico	The cargo ship burned and capsized at Tampico, Mexico. Raised in 1918.

== 29 May ==
List of shipwrecks: 29 May 1915
Ship	State	Description
Condor	United Kingdom	World War I: The trawler struck a mine and sank in the North Sea 30 nautical miles (56 km) north east of Scarborough, Yorkshire with the loss of all nine of her crew.
Cysne	Portugal	World War I: The coaster was sunk in the Atlantic Ocean 50 nautical miles (93 km) north west of Ouessant, Finistère, France by SM U-41 (Imperial German Navy).
Dixiana	United Kingdom	World War I: The cargo ship was torpedoed and sunk in the Atlantic Ocean 40 nautical miles (74 km) north of Ouessant by SM U-41 (Imperial German Navy). Her crew survived.
Glenlee	United Kingdom	World War I: The cargo ship was torpedoed and sunk in the Atlantic Ocean 67 nautical miles (124 km) south south west of the Wolf Rock, Cornwall by SM U-41 (Imperial German Navy). Her crew survived.
Merion	United Kingdom	World War I: The ocean liner was torpedoed and damaged in the Mediterranean Sea by UB-8 (Imperial German Navy). She sank on 31 May.
SMS T47	Imperial German Navy	World War I: The S43-class torpedo boat struck a mine and sank in the Baltic Sea.
SMS T51	Imperial German Navy	World War I: The S43-class torpedo boat struck a mine and sank in the Baltic Sea.
Virginia	Greece	World War I: The cargo ship was sunk in the Adriatic Sea 5 nautical miles (9.3 km) north west of Capo Salvore, Ancona, Italy (43°35′N 13°30′E) by SM U-12 (Austro-Hungarian Navy).

== 30 May ==
List of shipwrecks: 30 May 1915
Ship	State	Description
Søborg	Denmark	World War I: The cargo ship was torpedoed and sunk in the North Sea 40 nautical miles (74 km) north east of the mouth of the River Tyne (55°49′N 0°22′E) by SM U-16 (Imperial German Navy). Her crew survived.

== 31 May ==
List of shipwrecks: 31 May 1915
Ship	State	Description
Montrosa	Finland	World War I: The barque sank in the North Sea off the coast of Yorkshire, United Kingdom following an explosion. She probably struck a naval mine. Her fourteen crew were rescued by Brunia (Sweden).

== Unknown date ==
List of shipwrecks: unknown May 1915
Ship	State	Description
Rjinland	Netherlands	The fishing ship left Ijmuiden on 27 May and vanished.

== Bibliography ==
=== References ===
Fraccaroli, Aldo (1970). Italian Warships of World War I. Allan. p. 304. ISBN 9780711001053.
