= SM U-23 (Germany) =

German Submarine

History

German Empire
- Name: U-23
- Ordered: 18 March 1911
- Builder: Friedrich Krupp Germaniawerft, Kiel
- Cost: 2,808,000 Goldmark
- Yard number: 177
- Laid down: 21 December 1911
- Launched: 12 April 1913
- Commissioned: 11 September 1913
- Fate: Torpedoed and sunk on 20 July 1915

General characteristics Ocean-going diesel submarine
- Class & type: Type U 23 submarine
- Displacement: 669 t (658 long tons) surfaced; 864 t (850 long tons) submerged
- Length: 64.70 m (212.3 ft)
- Beam: 6.32 m (20 ft 9 in)
- Draught: 3.45 m (11 ft 4 in)
- Propulsion: 2 shafts; 2 × Germania 6-cylinder two stroke diesel motors with 1,800 PS (1,320 kW; 1,780 shp); 2 × SSW double Motordynamos with 1,200 PS (880 kW; 1,180 shp); 450rpm surfaced; 330 rpm submerged
- Speed: 16.7 knots (30.9 km/h; 19.2 mph) surfaced; 10.3 knots (19.1 km/h; 11.9 mph) submerged
- Range: 9,910 nmi (18,350 km; 11,400 mi) at 8 knots (15 km/h; 9.2 mph) surfaced; 85 nmi (157 km; 98 mi) at 5 knots (9.3 km/h; 5.8 mph) submerged
- Test depth: about 50 m (160 ft)
- Boats & landing craft carried: 1 dinghy
- Complement: 4 officers, 31 men
- Armament: 4 × 50 cm (19.7 in) torpedo tubes (2 each bow and stern); 6 torpedoes; 1 × 8.8 cm (3.5 in) SK L/30 gun

Service record
- Part of: IV Flotilla; 1 August 1914 - Unknown end; III Flotilla; Unknown start – 20 July 1915
- Commanders: Kptlt. Erwin Weisbach; 1 August – 25 November 1914; Kptlt. Hans Adam; 26 November – 17 December 1914; Kptlt. Egewolf Freiherr von Berckheim; 18 December 1914 – 12 January 1915; Kptlt. Hans Schultheß; 13 January – 20 July 1915
- Operations: 3 patrols
- Victories: 7 merchant ships sunk (8,822 GRT)

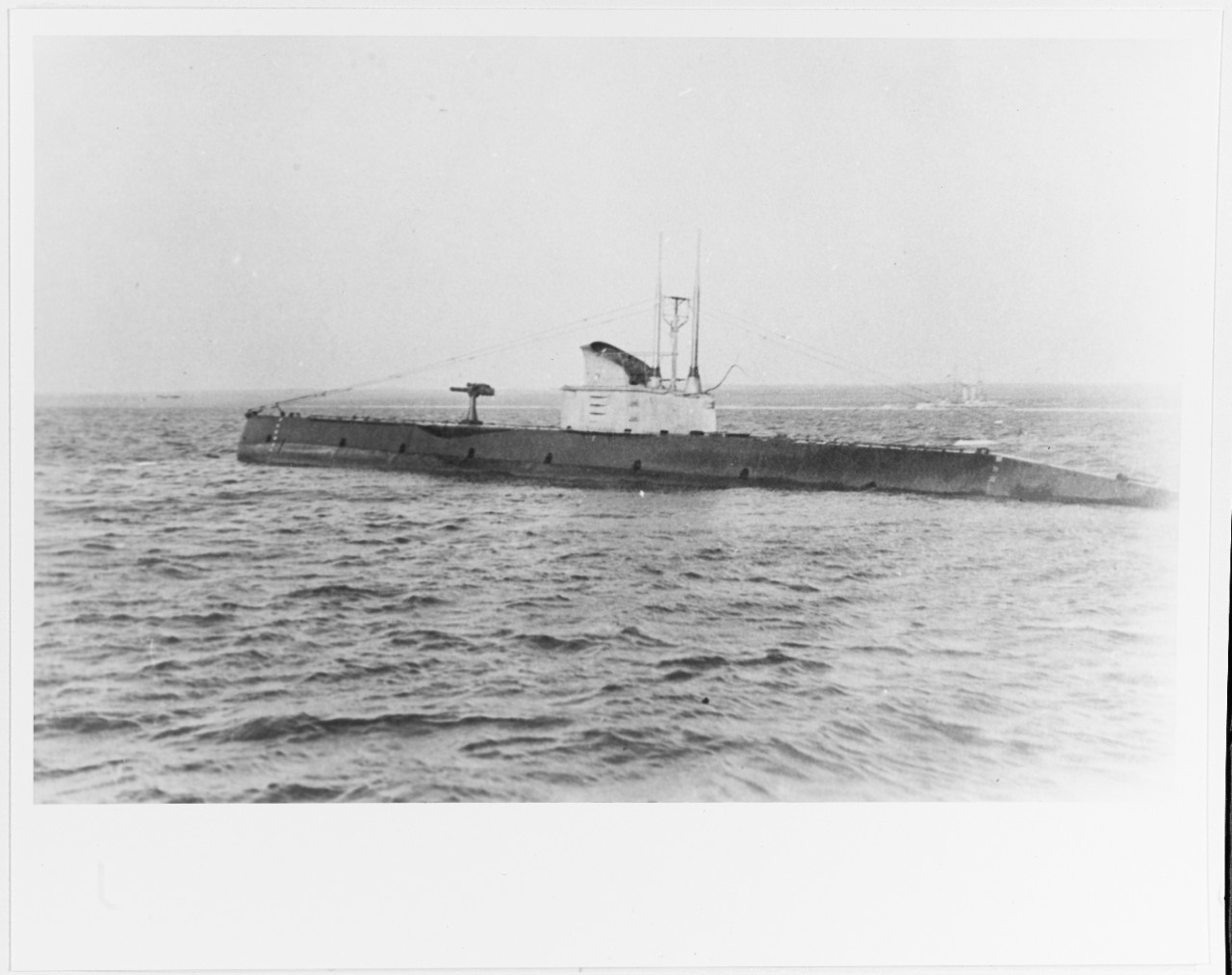
An Austro-Hungarian SM U-23

SM U-23 (Note: "SM" stands for "Seiner Majestät" (English: His Majesty's) and combined with the U for Unterseeboot would be translated as His Majesty's Submarine.) was one of the 329 U-boats serving in the Imperial German Navy in World War I.

U-23 was engaged in the naval warfare and took part in the First Battle of the Atlantic.

U-23 served on three war patrols, sinking a total of seven ships for 8,822 gross register tons (GRT). She was baited by the Q ship Princess Louise and torpedoed by HMS C27 at 58°55′N 0°14′E, off Fair Isle, in Shetland, Scotland. Twenty four men died and 10 survived.

== Summary of raiding history ==
Date	Name	Nationality	Tonnage (Note: Tonnages are in gross register tons)	Fate
13 March 1915	Invergyle	United Kingdom	1,794	Sunk
15 March 1915	Fingal	United Kingdom	1,562	Sunk
15 May 1915	Martha	Denmark	1,182	Sunk
19 May 1915	Chrysolite	United Kingdom	222	Sunk
19 May 1915	Crimond	United Kingdom	173	Sunk
19 May 1915	Lucerne	United Kingdom	154	Sunk
22 May 1915	Minerva	Norway	3,735	Sunk

== Bibliography ==
- Gröner, Erich; Jung, Dieter; Maass, Martin (1991). U-boats and Mine Warfare Vessels. German Warships 1815–1945. Vol. 2. Translated by Thomas, Keith; Magowan, Rachel. London: Conway Maritime Press. ISBN 0-85177-593-4.
