= SM U-9 =

German Type U 9 U-boat

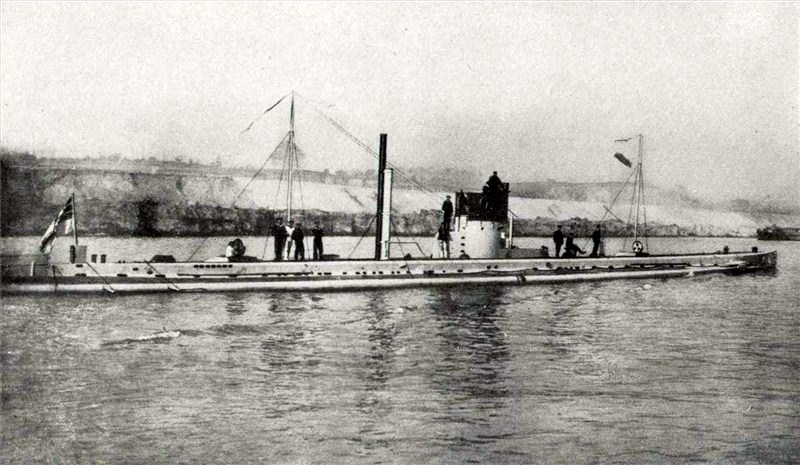
- U-9 ready for patrol.

History

German Empire
- Name: U-9
- Ordered: 15 July 1908
- Builder: Kaiserliche Werft, Danzig
- Cost: 2,140,000 Goldmark
- Yard number: 4
- Launched: 22 February 1910
- Commissioned: 18 April 1910
- Fate: Surrendered 26 November 1918. Broken up at Morecambe in 1919.

General characteristics
- Class & type: Type U 9 submarine
- Displacement: 493 tonnes (485 long tons) surfaced; 611 tonnes (601 long tons) submerged
- Length: 57.38 m (188 ft 3 in) (o/a); 48 m (157 ft 6 in) (pressure hull)
- Beam: 6 m (19 ft 8 in) (o/a); 3.65 m (12 ft) (pressure hull)
- Height: 7.05 m (23 ft 2 in)
- Draught: 3.13 m (10 ft 3 in)
- Installed power: 2 × Körting 6-cylinder and 2 × Körting 8-cylinder two stroke paraffin motors with a total of 1,000 PS (740 kW; 990 shp); 2 × SSW electric motors with 1,160 PS (850 kW; 1,140 shp); 550 rpm surfaced; 460 rpm submerged
- Propulsion: 2 shafts; 2 × 1.45 m (4 ft 9 in) propellers
- Speed: 14.2 knots (26.3 km/h; 16.3 mph) surfaced; 8.1 knots (15.0 km/h; 9.3 mph) submerged
- Range: 1,800 nmi (3,300 km; 2,100 mi) at 14 knots (26 km/h; 16 mph); 80 nmi (150 km; 92 mi) at 5 knots (9.3 km/h; 5.8 mph)
- Test depth: 50 m (160 ft)
- Boats & landing craft carried: 1 dinghy
- Complement: 4 officers, 25 enlisted
- Armament: four 45 cm (17.7 in) torpedo tubes (2 each bow and stern); 6 torpedoes; 1 × 3.7 cm (1.5 in) Hotchkiss gun; 1 × 5 cm (2 in) SK L/40 gun (from 1915); 1 × machine gun; 12 P-Mines (March–December 1916)

Service record
- Part of: I Flotilla; 1 August 1914 – 7 July 1915; Baltic Flotilla; 7 July 1914 – 20 April 1916; Training Flotilla; 20 April 1916 – 11 November 1918
- Commanders: Kptlt. Otto Weddigen; 1 October 1911 – 11 January 1915; Kptlt. Johannes Spieß; 12 January 1915 – 19 April 1916
- Operations: 7 patrols
- Victories: 13 merchant ships sunk (8,635 GRT); 4 warships sunk (43,350 tons); 1 auxiliary warship sunk (1,080 GRT)
- Awards: Iron Cross

SM U-9 was a German Type U 9 U-boat. She was one of 329 submarines serving in the Imperial German Navy and engaged in commerce raiding (Handelskrieg) during the First World War.

SM U-9 is notable for sinking three British armoured cruisers in the Action of 22 September 1914 and for being awarded the Iron Cross by the Kaiser, Wilhelm II.

== Construction ==
Her construction was ordered on 15 July 1908 and her keel was laid down by Kaiserliche Werft in Danzig. She was launched on 22 February 1910 and commissioned on 18 April 1910.

== Design ==
U-9 had an overall length of 57.38 m (188 ft 3 in), her pressure hull was 48 m (157 ft 6 in) long. The boat's beam was 6 m (19 ft 8 in) (o/a), while the pressure hull measured 3.65 m (12 ft 0 in). She had a draught of 3.13 m (10 ft 3 in) with a total height of 7.05 m (23 ft 2 in). The boat displaced 493 t (485 long tons) when surfaced and 611 t (601 long tons) when submerged.

U-9 was fitted with two Körting 8-cylinder plus two Körting 6-cylinder two-stroke petrol engines with a total of 1,000 metric horsepower (735 kW; 986 bhp) for use on the surface and two Siemens-Schuckert double-acting electric motors plus two electric motors with a total of 1,160 PS (853 kW; 1,144 shp) for underwater use. These engines powered two shafts, each with a 1.45 m (4.8 ft) propeller, which gave the boat a top surface speed of 14.2 knots (26.3 km/h; 16.3 mph), and 8.1 knots (15.0 km/h; 9.3 mph) when submerged. Cruising range was 1,800 nautical miles (3,300 km; 2,100 mi) at 14 knots (26 km/h; 16 mph) on the surface, and 80 nmi (150 km; 92 mi) at 5 knots (9.3 km/h; 5.8 mph) under water. Diving depth was 50 m (164 ft 1 in).

The U-boat was armed with four 50 cm (20 in) torpedo tubes, two fitted in the bow and two in the stern, and carried 6 torpedoes. Originally, the boat was equipped with a machine gun, which was augmented with a 3.7 cm (1.5 in) Hotchkiss gun when war broke out in 1914. In 1915, an additional 5 cm (2.0 in) gun was fitted. When U-9 underwent a major refit in 1916, two mine-laying rails were added, which were later removed again. The boat's complement was 4 officers and 31 enlisted.

== Service history ==
On 16 July 1914, the crew of U-9 reloaded the torpedo tubes while submerged, the first time a submarine had done so. On 1 August 1914, Kapitänleutnant Otto Weddigen took command. On 22 September, while patrolling the Broad Fourteens, a region of the southern North Sea, U-9 found a squadron of the British Cressy-class cruiser armoured cruisers HMS Aboukir, HMS Hogue, and HMS Cressy, that had been assigned to prevent German surface vessels from entering the eastern end of the English Channel. She fired four of her torpedoes, reloading while submerged and sank all three in less than an hour leading to the deaths of 1,459 British sailors.

It was one of the most notable submarine actions of all time. Members of the Admiralty who had considered submarines mere toys, no longer expressed that opinion after this event. On 15 October, U-9 sank HMS Hawke an Edgar class cruiser. On 12 January 1915, Johannes Spieß relieved Weddigen, and commanded U-9 until 19 April 1916. During this period, she sank 13 ships totalling 8,635 GRT, consisting of ten small fishing vessels and the British steamers Don, Queen Wilhelmina and Serbino. After April 1916, she was withdrawn from front-line duties to be used for training. U-9 and the raider SMS Emden were the only ships which Kaiser Wilhelm II awarded the Iron Cross.

== Raiding history ==
Ships sunk by U-9 (Note: Merchant ship tonnages are in gross register tons. Military vessels are listed by tons displacement)
Date	Name	Flag	GRT Disp	Notes
22 September 1914	HMS Aboukir	Royal Navy	12,000	Sunk
22 September 1914	HMS Cressy	Royal Navy	12,000	Sunk
22 September 1914	HMS Hogue	Royal Navy	12,000	Sunk
15 October 1914	HMS Hawke	Royal Navy	7,350	Sunk
3 May 1915	Bob White	United Kingdom	191	Sunk
3 May 1915	Coquet	United Kingdom	176	Sunk
3 May 1915	Hector	United Kingdom	179	Sunk
3 May 1915	Hero	United Kingdom	173	Sunk
3 May 1915	Iolanthe	United Kingdom	179	Sunk
3 May 1915	Northward Ho	United Kingdom	180	Sunk
3 May 1915	Progress	United Kingdom	273	Sunk
4 May 1915	Rugby	United Kingdom	205	Sunk
5 May 1915	Straton	United Kingdom	198	Sunk
6 May 1915	Merrie Islington	United Kingdom	147	Sunk
8 May 1915	Don	United Kingdom	939	Sunk
8 May 1915	Queen Wilhelmina	United Kingdom	3,590	Sunk
16 August 1915	Serbino	United Kingdom	2,205	Sunk
5 November 1915	Dagö (n.4)	Imperial Russian Navy	1,080	Sunk

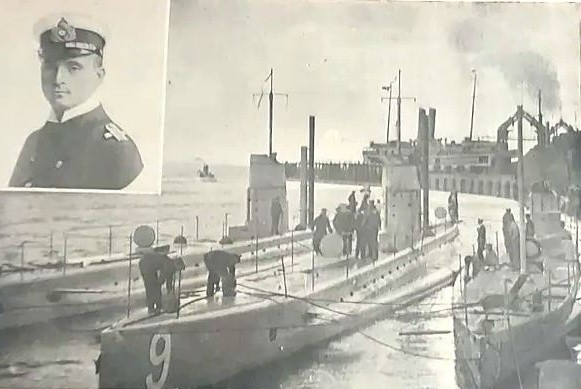
U-9 docked in Sassnitz

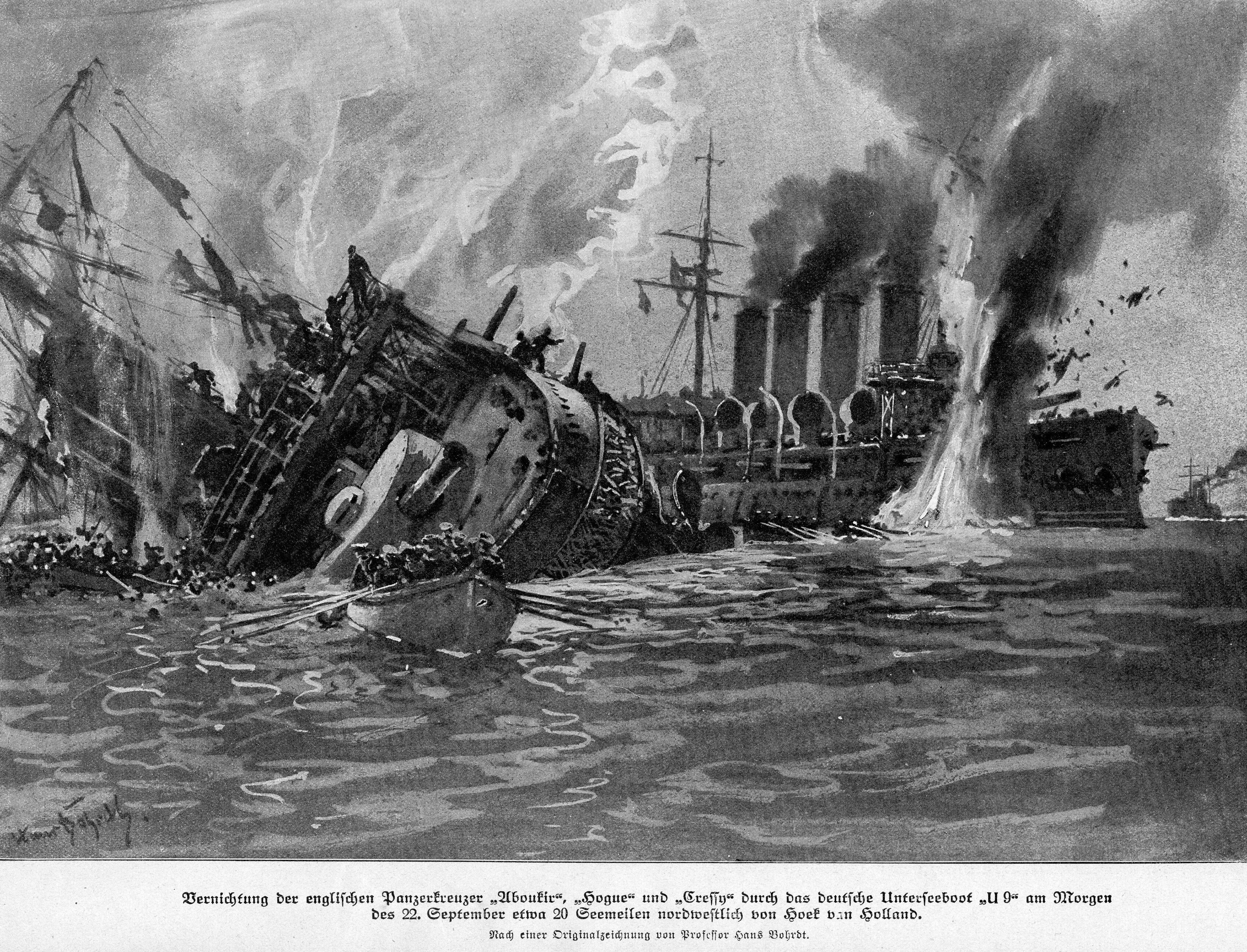
Illustration by Hans Bohrdt depicting the sinking of HMS Cressy, HMS Hogue and HMS Aboukir by U-9 on 22 September 1914 off the Dutch coast.

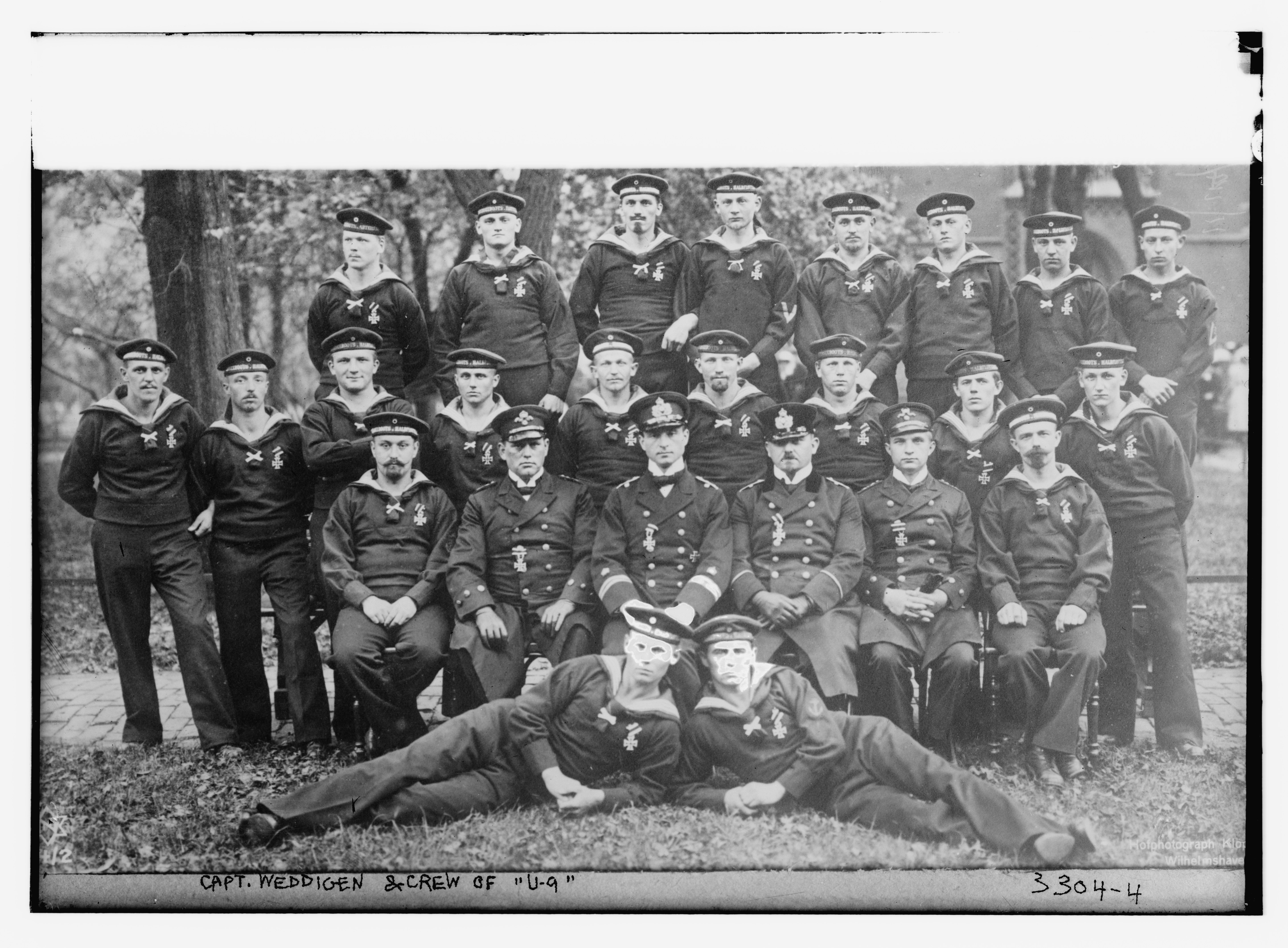
The men of U-9.

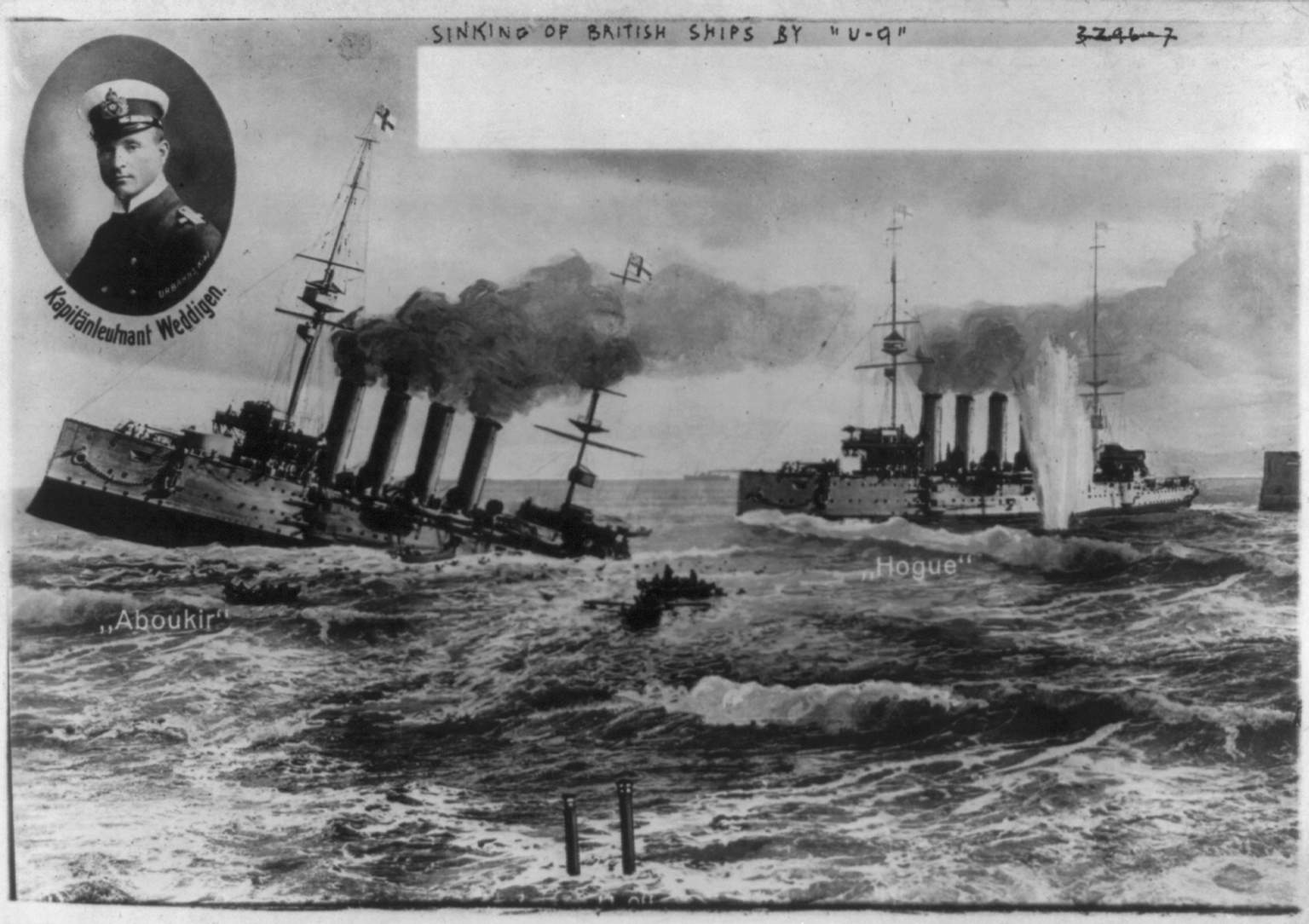
Propaganda postcard depicting victories of U-9

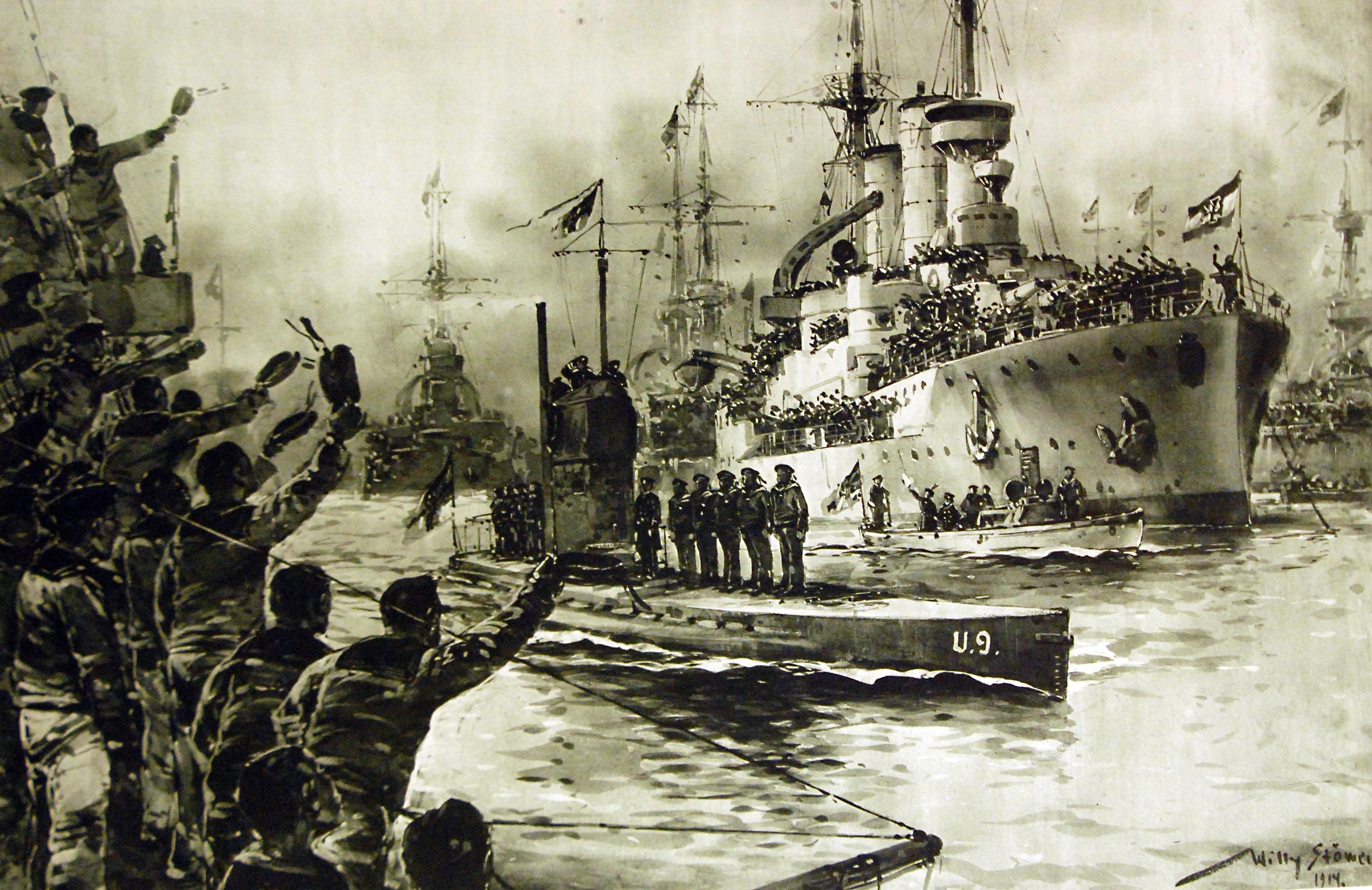
The return of U-9 to Wilhelmshaven, Germany illustration by Willy Stöwer

== Bibliography ==
- Farquharson-Roberts, Mike (2014). A History of the Royal Navy: World War I. London: I.B. Tauris. ISBN 978-1-78076-838-0.
- Gröner, Erich; Jung, Dieter; Maass, Martin (1991). German Warships 1815–1945, U-boats and Mine Warfare Vessels. Vol. 2. Translated by Thomas, Keith; Magowan, Rachel. London: Conway Maritime Press. ISBN 0-85177-593-4.
