= SM U-16 (Germany) =

Submarine

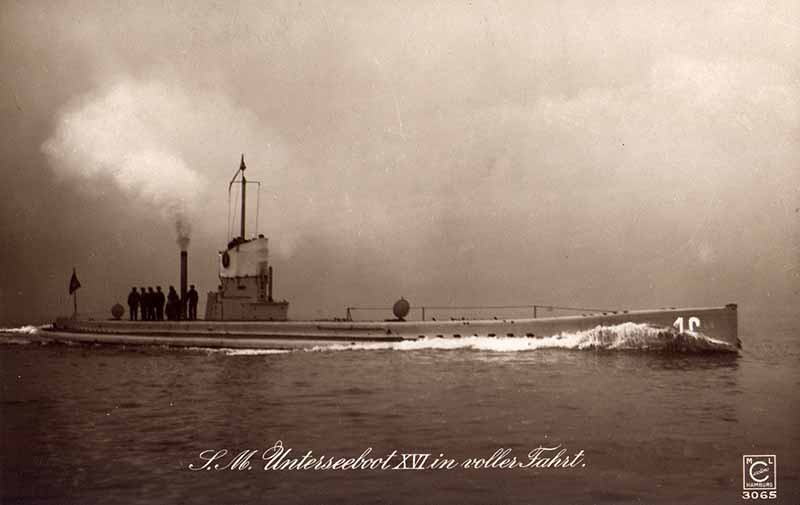
- SM U-16 Underway.

Class overview
- Operators: Imperial German Navy
- Preceded by: Type U 13
- Succeeded by: Type U 17
- Completed: 1

History

Germany
- Name: U-16
- Ordered: 26 August 1909
- Builder: Germaniawerft, Kiel
- Cost: 2,539,000 Goldmark
- Yard number: 157
- Laid down: 10 May 1910
- Launched: 29 August 1911
- Commissioned: 28 December 1911
- Fate: Sunk in February 1919 in an accident at position 53°59′N 08°29′E while on passage to surrender. Its wreck was raised on September 2025.

General characteristics
- Class & type: Unique submarine
- Displacement: 489 t (481 long tons) surfaced; 627 t (617 long tons) submerged
- Length: 57.80 m (189 ft 8 in)
- Beam: 6.00 m (19 ft 8 in)
- Draught: 3.36 m (11 ft 0 in)
- Propulsion: 2 shafts; 2 × Körting 6-cylinder and 2 × Körting 8-cylinder two stroke paraffin motors with 900 PS (660 kW; 890 shp); 2 × SSW electric motors with 1,040 PS (760 kW; 1,030 shp); 550 rpm surfaced; 600 rpm submerged
- Speed: 15.6 knots (28.9 km/h; 18.0 mph) surfaced; 10.7 knots (19.8 km/h; 12.3 mph) submerged
- Range: 2,100 nautical miles (3,900 km; 2,400 mi) at 15 kn
- Test depth: 50 m (160 ft)
- Complement: 4 officers, 25 men
- Armament: 4 × 45 cm (17.7 in) torpedo tubes (2 each bow and stern) with 6 torpedoes; 1 × 5 cm (2.0 in) SK L/40 gun

Service record
- Part of: II Flotilla; 1 August 1914 – unknown end
- Commanders: Kptlt. Claus Hansen; 1 August 1914 – 15 March 1915; Oblt.z.S. Leo Hillebrand; 16 March – 21 October 1915
- Operations: 4 patrols
- Victories: 11 merchant ships sunk (11,730 GRT); 2 merchant ships damaged (11,228 GRT); 1 merchant ship taken as prize (838 GRT)

SM U-16 (Note: "SM" stands for "Seiner Majestät" (English: His Majesty's) and combined with the U for Unterseeboot would be translated as His Majesty's Submarine.) was one of the 329 submarines serving in the Imperial German Navy in World War I.

== Service history ==
U-16 was a pre-war U-boat, built by Friedrich Krupp Germaniawerft and served up to 1915 when she was utilized as a training submarine. It engaged in the naval warfare and took part in the First Battle of the Atlantic.

During its service, it sunk 11 ships, damaged 2, and took a Swedish ship as a prize.

== Sinking ==
After the war ended, in 1919 the ship was en route to Harwich to be turned in as war booty. However, an accident occurred wherein U-16 sunk off the island of Scharhörn.

== Raising the wreck ==
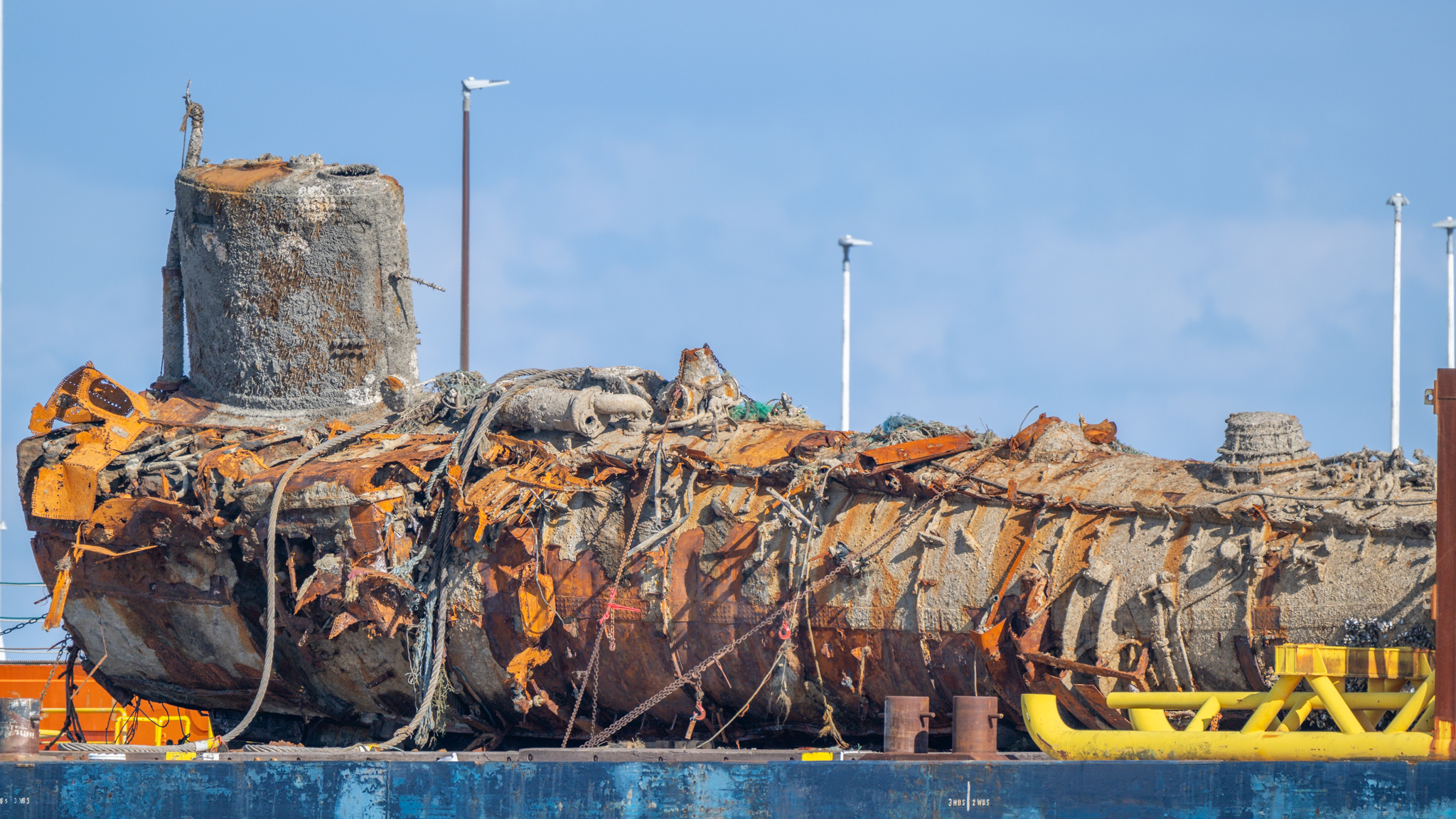
Stern and sail of the wreck

With two institutions in charge of the wreck, the country´s Institute for Federal Real Estate (BlmA) and the state of Hamburg´s Wasserstraßen- und Schifffahrtsamt Elbe-Nordsee, the fate of U-16 remained unsettled. Experts feared, the wreck, lying at a depth of 20 meters and stuck in the mud of the Wadden Sea up to the original waterline, could move further into the mouth of the Elbe, a major shipping lane to Hamburg and threaten commercial shipping, so the Wasserstraßen- und Schifffahrtsamt Elbe-Nordsee finally decided to raise the wreck. Without BlmA approval.

During the night of 31 August to 1 September 2025, the wreck was raised from a depth of about 20 meters by the dutch crane vessel Matador 3. During the operation, the submarine broke apart. Part of the vessel remained on the seabed off Scharhörn, the rest was brought to Cuxhaven. The remaining bow section was raised two days later. Museums expressed interest in obtaining some smaller pieces of equipment from the wreck, but the conservation status of the hull was considered to be too bad to save it. Others estimated a preservation to be possible but too expensive.

The entire recovery was labeled "stuporous" by a Hamburg state archeologist. After his judgement, moving the wreck a few meters away from the shipping lane would have been sufficient.

== Summary of raiding history ==
Date	Ship Name	Nationality	Tonnage (Note: Tonnages are in gross register tons)	Fate
15 February 1915	Dulwich	United Kingdom	3,289	Sunk
15 February 1915	Ville de Lille	France	997	Sunk
18 February 1915	Dinorah	France	4,208	Damaged
19 February 1915	Belridge	Norway	7,020	Damaged
26 May 1915	M. Roosval	Sweden	309	Sunk
26 May 1915	Betty	Denmark	2,109	Sunk
28 May 1915	Mars	Russian Empire	251	Sunk
30 May 1915	Søborg	Denmark	2,108	Sunk
20 September 1915	Thorvaldsen	Denmark	1,220	Sunk
26 September 1915	Ellen Benzon	Denmark	143	Sunk
29 September 1915	Flora	Norway	184	Sunk
29 September 1915	Actie	Norway	562	Sunk
30 September 1915	Florida	Norway	558	Sunk
1 October 1915	Pallas	Sweden	838	Captured as prize
