= SM U-41 (Germany) =

World War I combat submarine

Coordinates: 49°10′N 7°20′W

History

German Empire
- Name: U-41
- Ordered: 12 June 1912
- Builder: Germaniawerft, Kiel
- Yard number: 201
- Laid down: 22 April 1913
- Launched: 10 October 1914
- Commissioned: 1 February 1915
- Fate: Sunk, 24 September 1915

General characteristics
- Class & type: Type U 31 submarine
- Displacement: 685 t (674 long tons) (surfaced); 878 t (864 long tons) (submerged)
- Length: 64.70 m (212 ft 3 in) (o/a); 52.36 m (171 ft 9 in) (pressure hull)
- Beam: 6.32 m (20 ft 9 in) (o/a); 4.05 m (13 ft 3 in) (pressure hull)
- Draught: 3.56 m (11 ft 8 in)
- Installed power: 2 × 1,850 PS (1,361 kW; 1,825 shp) diesel engines; 2 × 1,200 PS (883 kW; 1,184 shp) Doppelmodyn
- Propulsion: 2 × shafts; 2 × 1.60 m (5 ft 3 in) propellers
- Speed: 16.4 knots (30.4 km/h; 18.9 mph) (surfaced); 9.7 knots (18.0 km/h; 11.2 mph) (submerged)
- Range: 8,790 nmi (16,280 km; 10,120 mi) at 8 knots (15 km/h; 9.2 mph) (surfaced); 80 nmi (150 km; 92 mi) at 5 knots (9.3 km/h; 5.8 mph) (submerged)
- Test depth: 50 m (164 ft 1 in)
- Boats & landing craft carried: 1 dinghy
- Complement: 4 officers, 31 enlisted
- Armament: four 50 cm (20 in) torpedo tubes (2 each bow and stern); 6 torpedoes; one 8.8 cm (3.5 in) SK L/30 deck gun

Service record
- Part of: II Flotilla; Unknown start – 24 September 1915
- Commanders: Kptlt. Claus Hansen; 1 February – 24 September 1915
- Operations: 4 patrols
- Victories: 28 merchant ships sunk (58,546 GRT); 1 merchant ship damaged (4,409 GRT); 1 merchant ship taken as prize (355 GRT)

SM U-41 (Note: "SM" stands for "Seiner Majestät" (English: His Majesty's) and combined with the U for Unterseeboot would be translated as His Majesty's Submarine) was one of the 329 submarines serving in the Imperial German Navy in World War I. U-41 engaged in naval warfare and took part in the First Battle of the Atlantic.

== Design ==
Type U 31 submarines were double-hulled, ocean-going submarines similar to Type 23 and Type 27 subs in dimensions and differed only slightly in propulsion and speed. They were considered very good high sea boats with average manoeuvrability and good surface steering.

U-41 had an overall length of 64.70 m (212 ft 3 in), her pressure hull was 52.36 m (171 ft 9 in) long. The boat's beam was 6.32 m (20 ft 9 in) (o/a), while the pressure hull measured 4.05 m (13 ft 3 in). Type 31s had a draught of 3.56 m (11 ft 8 in) with a total height of 7.68–8.04 m (25 ft 2 in – 26 ft 5 in). The boats displaced a total of 971 tonnes (956 long tons); 685 t (674 long tons) when surfaced and 878 t (864 long tons) when submerged.

U-41 was fitted with two Germania 6-cylinder two-stroke diesel engines with a total of 1,850 metric horsepower (1,361 kW; 1,825 bhp) for use on the surface and two Siemens-Schuckert double-acting electric motors with a total of 1,200 PS (883 kW; 1,184 shp) for underwater use. These engines powered two shafts each with a 1.60 m (5 ft 3 in) propeller, which gave the boat a top surface speed of 16.4 knots (30.4 km/h; 18.9 mph), and 9.7 knots (18.0 km/h; 11.2 mph) when submerged. Cruising range was 8,790 nautical miles (16,280 km; 10,120 mi) at 8 knots (15 km/h; 9.2 mph) on the surface, and 80 nmi (150 km; 92 mi) at 5 knots (9.3 km/h; 5.8 mph) under water. Diving depth was 50 m (164 ft 1 in).

The U-boat was armed with four 50 cm (20 in) torpedo tubes, two fitted in the bow and two in the stern, and carried 6 torpedoes. Additionally U-41 was equipped in 1915 with one 8.8 cm (3.5 in) Uk L/30 deck gun. The boat's complement was 4 officers and 31 enlisted.

== Fate ==
After the British heard of the sinking of the Anglo-Columbian on 23 December, HMS Wyandra, a British Q-ship in the guise of the American-flagged merchantman Baralong set out from Falmouth to present itself as a target.

U-41 stopped the 6,651 gross register tons (GRT) merchantman Urbino on 24 December about 70 miles from Bishop Rock. U-41 sent a boarding party aboard to inspect the cargo. After finding war material on board, the Germans put the merchant crew off the ship in the lifeboats. U-41 was in the process of sinking Urbino with gunfire when, "Baralong", arrived on the scene at around 9:45, flying an American flag. Baralong turned away so that U-41 would be forced to use her diesel engines to catch up, and in doing so be fully surfaced. U-41 signalled Baralong to send their papers across in a ships boat. The crew of Baralong went through the motions of preparing a boat, while at same time readying for combat, and in doing so closed the distance to 700 yards and turned so her hidden guns were able to bear. Wyandra then fired its guns accompanied by rifle fire from Marines onboard. U-41 got off one shell in return before the crew abandoned the deck gun. One of Wyandras shots hit the submarine's conning tower killing the commander Kapitänleutnant Hansen and six others. After other hits, U-41 listed then dived but then rose again before sinking - only Oberleutnant zur See Iwan Crompton (badly wounded) and the helmsman escaping (Note: Chatterton gives the rest of the crew as five officers and twenty five men) to be picked up along with the 42 from the Urbino by Wyandra. After Crompton returned to Germany in 1917, he claimed Wyandra had run down the lifeboat he was in.

It was also claimed that the Wyandra had not struck the American flag before firing which was a violation of the rules of war; while the use of a False Flag was allowed, it was required that a belligerent identify itself before initiating hostilities.

The event generated widespread outrage in Germany, especially among Kriegsmarine officers. The sinking was also commemorated in a propaganda medal designed by the German medallist Karl Goetz.

== Summary of raiding history ==
Date	Name	Nationality	Tonnage (Note: Tonnages are in gross register tons, a measure of volumetric capacity)	Fate
2 May 1915	America	Norway	3,706	Sunk
2 May 1915	Cruiser	United Kingdom	146	Sunk
2 May 1915	Martaban	United Kingdom	148	Sunk
2 May 1915	Mercury	United Kingdom	222	Sunk
2 May 1915	St. George	United Kingdom	215	Sunk
3 May 1915	Oscar	Norway	107	Sunk
3 May 1915	Roxane	Sweden	355	Captured as prize
25 May 1915	Nebraskan	United States	4,409	Damaged
26 May 1915	Morwenna	United Kingdom	1,414	Sunk
27 May 1915	Cadeby	United Kingdom	1,130	Sunk
28 May 1915	Ethiope	United Kingdom	3,794	Sunk
28 May 1915	Spennymoor	United Kingdom	2,733	Sunk
28 May 1915	Tullochmoor	United Kingdom	3,520	Sunk
29 May 1915	Cysne	Portugal	623	Sunk
29 May 1915	Dixiana	United Kingdom	3,329	Sunk
29 May 1915	Glenlee	United Kingdom	4,140	Sunk
16 July 1915	Balva	Russian Empire	1,165	Sunk
17 July 1915	General Radetzky	Russian Empire	2,118	Sunk
24 July 1915	Grangewood	United Kingdom	3,422	Sunk
25 July 1915	Celtic	United Kingdom	264	Sunk
25 July 1915	Cydonia	United Kingdom	259	Sunk
25 July 1915	Emblem	United Kingdom	157	Sunk
25 July 1915	Gadwall	United Kingdom	192	Sunk
25 July 1915	Honoria	United Kingdom	179	Sunk
25 July 1915	Leelenaw	United States	1,923	Sunk
28 July 1915	Trondhjemsfjord	Norway	4,248	Sunk
23 September 1915	Anglo-Colombian	United Kingdom	4,792	Sunk
23 September 1915	Chancellor	United Kingdom	4,586	Sunk
23 September 1915	Hesione	United Kingdom	3,363	Sunk
24 September 1915	Urbino	United Kingdom	6,651	Sunk

== Bibliography ==
- Gröner, Erich; Jung, Dieter; Maass, Martin (1991). U-boats and Mine Warfare Vessels. German Warships 1815–1945. Vol. 2. Translated by Thomas, Keith; Magowan, Rachel. London: Conway Maritime Press. ISBN 0-85177-593-4.
- Chatterton, E. Keble (1922). Q-Ships and Their Story. Sidgwick & Jackson.
