= List of shipwrecks in May 1916 =

The list of shipwrecks in May 1916 includes ships sunk, foundered, grounded, or otherwise lost during May 1916.

== 1 May ==
List of shipwrecks: 1 May 1916
Ship	State	Description
Bernadette	France	World War I: The three-masted schooner was sunk in the Atlantic Ocean (50°10′N 11°00′W) by SM U-20 (Imperial German Navy).
Hendonhall	United Kingdom	World War I: The cargo ship stuck a mine and sank in the North Sea (51°51′00″N 1°54′45″E). Her crew survived.
Rio Branco	Brazil	World War I: The cargo ship was torpedoed and sunk in the North Sea 50 nautical miles (93 km) east by north of the Longstone Lighthouse, Northumberland, United Kingdom by SM UB-27 (Imperial German Navy). Her crew survived.
SMS S123	Imperial German Navy	World War I: The S90-class torpedo boat struck a mine and sank in the North Sea.

== 2 May ==
List of shipwrecks: 2 May 1916
Ship	State	Description
Fridland	Sweden	World War I: The cargo ship struck a mine and was damaged in the North Sea off the Longsand Lightship (United Kingdom) (51°51′N 1°56′E) and was beached at Blyth, Northumberland without loss of life. She was later refloated, repaired and returned to service.
Le Pilier	France	World War I: The barque was torpedoed and sunk in the Bay of Biscay (47°50′N 5°50′W) by SM U-45 (Imperial German Navy). Her crew survived.
Maud	United Kingdom	World War I: The schooner was shelled and sunk in the Atlantic Ocean 50 nautical miles (93 km) south west of Ouessant, Finistère, France (47°50′N 7°30′W) by SM U-45 (Imperial German Navy). Her crew survived.
Mars	Norway	World War I: The barge was scuttled in the North Sea by SM UB-27 (Imperial German Navy).
Memento	Norway	World War I: The sailing vessel was sunk in the North Sea (56°15′N 2°46′E) by SM UB-27 (Imperial German Navy). Her crew survived.
Rochester City	United Kingdom	World War I: The cargo ship struck a mine placed by SM UC-10 (Imperial German Navy) and sank in the North Sea 3 nautical miles (5.6 km) off Southwold, Suffolk (52°10′N 1°47′E) with the loss of a crew member.
Ruabon	United Kingdom	World War I: The cargo ship was captured, torpedoed and sunk in the Atlantic Ocean 160 nautical miles (300 km) west by south of Ouessant by SM U-20 (Imperial German Navy). Her crew survived. Her crew were rescued by Misurata (Italy).
Superb	Norway	World War I: The lighter, a converted barque, was scuttled in the North Sea (56°16′N 3°55′E) by SM UB-27 (Imperial German Navy). Her crew survived.

== 3 May ==
List of shipwrecks: 3 May 1916
Ship	State	Description
Marie Molinos	France	World War I: The barque was intercepted, shelled and sunk in the Bay of Biscay (46°35′N 5°05′W) by SM U-20 (Imperial German Navy). Her crew abandoned ship before she was scuttled and were rescued the next day by Wenceslao (Spain).

== 4 May ==
List of shipwrecks: 4 May 1916
Ship	State	Description
HMT Crownsin	Royal Navy	World War I: The naval trawler struck a mine placed by SM U-73 (Imperial German Navy) and sank in the Mediterranean Sea off Malta with the loss of eleven crew.

== 5 May ==
List of shipwrecks: 5 May 1916
Ship	State	Description
Harald	Sweden	World War I: The schooner was sunk in the North Sea by SM UB-21 (Imperial German Navy). Her crew survived.

== 6 May ==
List of shipwrecks: 6 May 1916
Ship	State	Description
Galgate	United Kingdom	World War I: The four-masted full-rigged ship was shelled and sunk in the Atlantic Ocean 190 nautical miles (350 km) south west by west of The Lizard, Cornwall by SM U-20 (Imperial German Navy). Her crew survived.
James W. Fischer	United Kingdom	The schooner was driven ashore at Bull Bay, Anglesey and was wrecked with the loss of all but one of her crew.
Rosa	Sweden	The barquentine was driven ashore at North Sunderland, County Durham, United Kingdom and was wrecked. Her eight crew were rescued by the Seahouses Lifeboat.
St. Catherine	United Kingdom	The cargo ship was driven ashore at Genoa, Italy. Her crew were rescued.

== 7 May ==
List of shipwrecks: 7 May 1916
Ship	State	Description
Speed	Norway	The cargo ship collided with another vessel and sank in the Bristol Channel off Barry, Glamorgan, United Kingdom with the loss of five of her thirteen crew.
Svanhild	Sweden	World War I: The wooden schooner, en route from Gävle to Århus, struck a mine off Sandhamn in the Baltic Sea. She was deep in the water but floating on the cargo. The crew managed to sail her back to harbour, but after inspection she was condemned.

== 8 May ==
List of shipwrecks: 8 May 1916
Ship	State	Description
Cymric	United Kingdom	World War I: The ocean liner was torpedoed and sunk in the Atlantic Ocean 140 nautical miles (260 km) west north west of the Fastnet Rock by U-20 (Imperial German Navy) with the loss of five lives.
S. R. Kirby	United States	The cargo ship either broke in two and foundered without warning or broke up on rocks in Lake Superior off Eagle Harbor, Michigan in a severe storm with the loss of her captain and 18 or 19 of her 22 crew. One crewman rescued by the barge Hartnell, one by Berwind, and two by Block (all flag unknown). The wreck was located in 2019.

== 9 May ==
List of shipwrecks: 9 May 1916
Ship	State	Description
Roanoke	United States	The cargo ship owned by the North Pacific Steamship Company had left San Francisco bound for Valparaíso, Chile with a cargo of explosives, wheat, oil and gasoline. It foundered in heavy seas in the Pacific Ocean off Point Buchon, California at about 3 p.m. 47 people died and three crew members were rescued from a lifeboat that beached near San Luis Obispo, California.

== 10 May ==
List of shipwrecks: 10 May 1916
Ship	State	Description
Dolcoath	United Kingdom	World War I: The cargo ship struck a mine and sank in the North Sea 3.25 nautical miles (6.02 km) north north east of North Foreland, Kent with the loss of a crew member.
Panther	United Kingdom	The ketch was driven ashore at Hunstanton, Norfolk and was wrecked. Her crew were rescued.
Pursuit	United Kingdom	The schooner sprang a leak in The Wash and was beached at Hunstanton. Her crew were rescued by the Hunstanton Lifeboat.
Som	Imperial Russian Navy	The Som-class submarine accidentally collided with Ångermanland (Sweden) and sank in the Sea of Åland, in the area between the island of Arholma and Svartklubben lighthouse. 18 crew were killed in the incident. The discovery of a submarine wreck off the coast of Sweden in 2015, was confirmed by the Swedish Armed Forces in July of that year to in all likelihood be that of Som.

== 11 May ==
List of shipwrecks: 11 May 1916
Ship	State	Description
Ivie	United States	The schooner barge sank in Hampton Roads, Virginia after colliding with Berkshire (flag unknown).
Tategami Maru	Japan	The cargo ship collided with Omi Maru (Japan) in the Inland Sea of Japan and was consequently beached.

== 12 May ==
List of shipwrecks: 12 May 1916
Ship	State	Description
Klotawah	United States	The yacht was destroyed by fire when Thomas Thurston's shipyard at Alexandria Bay, New York, burned down.
Unknown yacht	United States	The yacht was destroyed by fire when Thomas Thurston's shipyard at Alexandria Bay, New York, burned down.

== 13 May ==
List of shipwrecks: 13 May 1916
Ship	State	Description
Eretria	United Kingdom	World War I: The cargo ship struck a mine and sank in the Bay of Biscay 15 nautical miles (28 km) south south west of the Île d'Yeu, Vendée, France.
SMS Hamberg	Imperial German Navy	The naval drifter/Vorpostenboot was lost on this date.

== 14 May ==
List of shipwrecks: 14 May 1916
Ship	State	Description
HMS M30	Royal Navy	World War I: The M29-class monitor was shelled and sunk in the Gulf of Smyrna by Ottoman shore-based artillery.
Sappho	United Kingdom	The 1694 grt cargo ship became stuck in ice in December 1915 in the White Sea and was abandoned. During salvage attempts she sank, though some sources have final sinking date of 16 May.

== 15 May ==
List of shipwrecks: 15 May 1916
Ship	State	Description
Mira	France	World War I: The cargo ship was shelled and sunk in the Mediterranean Sea east of Sicily, Italy (36°15′N 15°54′E) by SM U-34 (Imperial German Navy).

== 16 May ==
List of shipwrecks: 16 May 1916
Ship	State	Description
Batavier V	Netherlands	World War I: The passenger ship struck a mine and sank in the North Sea near the Inner Gabbard Lightship (51°58′00″N 1°57′45″E) with the loss of four lives.
HMS Clifford	Royal Navy	World War I: The fleet messenger was sunk in the Mediterranean Sea (34°02′N 27°32′E) by SM U-38 (Imperial German Navy). Her crew survived.
Etretria	United Kingdom	World War I: The passenger ship struck a mine and sank in the Bay of Biscay off the Île d'Yeu, Vendée, France.
Sant' Andrea	Italy	World War I: The brigantine was sunk in the Mediterranean Sea 20 nautical miles (37 km) off Port Torres, Mallorca, Spain (40°51′N 6°48′E) by SM U-34 (Imperial German Navy).

== 17 May ==
List of shipwrecks: 17 May 1916
Ship	State	Description
Bianca	Germany	World War I: The 1,054-gross register ton collier was sunk by the submarine Volk (Imperial Russian Navy) in the Bay of Norrköping. The crew survived.
Boy Percy	United Kingdom	World War I: The fishing smack was scuttled in the North Sea off Southwold, Suffolk by SM UB-29 (Imperial German Navy) with the loss of all hands.
Boy Sam	United Kingdom	World War I: The fishing smack was scuttled in the North Sea off Southwold by SM UB-29 (Imperial German Navy). Her crew did not survived.
Hera	Germany	World War I: The 2,800-gross register ton collier was sunk by the submarine Volk (Imperial Russian Navy) in the Bay of Norrköping. The crew survived.
Installer	United States	The 18-gross register ton motor vessel was wrecked without loss of life on Forrester Island in the Alexander Archipelago in Southeast Alaska.
Kolga	Germany	World War I: The 2,086-gross register ton collier was torpedoed, shelled, and sunk by the submarine Volk (Imperial Russian Navy) in the Bay of Norrköping. The captain and five crewmen died.
Lucia Porter	United States	The lumber schooner went ashore in a gale at Swampscott, Massachusetts, 15 miles (24 km) north of Boston, Massachusetts, a total loss. The crew were rescued by the United States Life Saving Service.
Research	United Kingdom	World War I: The fishing smack was scuttled in the North Sea 35 nautical miles (65 km) east by south of Cromer, Norfolk by SM UB-18 (Imperial German Navy) with the loss of a crew member.
Stura	Italy	World War I: The cargo ship was sunk in the Adriatic Sea 17 nautical miles (31 km) east of Brindisi, Apulia, Italy (40°47′N 19°00′E) by SM U-15 (Austro-Hungarian Navy). Her crew survived.
Trave	Germany	World War I: The coaster was torpedoed and sunk in the Kattegat off the Kullen Lighthouse, Sweden, by a Royal Navy submarine. Her fourteen crew survived.
SM U-74	Imperial German Navy	World War I: The Type UE I submarine sank in the North Sea 3.5 nautical miles (6.5 km) off Dunbar, Lothian, United Kingdom after the accidental explosion of a mine she was laying.
Wanderer	United Kingdom	World War I: The fishing smack was scuttled in the North Sea off Southwold by SM UB-29 (Imperial German Navy). Her five crew took to the lifeboat but were not recovered.

== 18 May ==
List of shipwrecks: 18 May 1916
Ship	State	Description
Adamantios Korais	Greece	World War I: The cargo ship was scuttled in the Mediterranean Sea 30 nautical miles (56 km) south south east of Toulon, Var, France (42°38′N 6°13′E) by SM U-34 (Imperial German Navy). Her crew survived.
HMT Carbineer	Royal Navy	The naval trawler hit the Crim Rocks in the Isles of Scilly and was run ashore on Great Crebawethan becoming a total loss.
HMML 40	Royal Navy	The motor launch was lost on this date.
Osprey	United Kingdom	World War I: The fishing vessel was scuttled in the North Sea 13 nautical miles (24 km) east north east of the Spurn Lightship (United Kingdom) by SM UB-19 (Imperial German Navy). Her crew survived.
Ponto	Norway	The cargo ship collided with Fredsael (Norway) off Barry, Glamorgan, United Kingdom and sank. Her crew were rescued.

== 19 May ==
List of shipwrecks: 19 May 1916
Ship	State	Description
Hermion	Norway	The cargo ship caught fire and sank at New York, United States.

== 20 May ==
List of shipwrecks: 20 May 1916
Ship	State	Description
Erminios	Italy	World War I: The barque was sunk in the Mediterranean Sea 20 nautical miles (37 km) south of Palma de Mallorca, Mallorca, Spain (41°05′N 3°50′E) by SM U-34 (Imperial German Navy).
Fabricotti F.	Italy	World War I: The brigantine was sunk in the Gulf of Lion 45 nautical miles (83 km) off Cape San Sebastian, Spain (41°37′N 3°59′E) by SM U-34 (Imperial German Navy).
Kin Ling	United Kingdom	The cargo ship caught fire and sank at Kiangyin, China.
Languedoc	France	World War I: The cargo ship was sunk in the Gulf of Lion off Cape San Sebastian (41°55′N 4°15′E) by SM U-34 (Imperial German Navy). Her crew survived.
Manu	Spain	The cargo ship was driven ashore 3 nautical miles (5.6 km) west of St. Ives, Cornwall, United Kingdom and was abandoned by her crew.
Redentore	Italy	World War I: The barquentine was sunk in the Straits of Messina (37°19′N 13°17′E) by SM U-39 (Imperial German Navy).
Valsesia	Italy	World War I: The sailing vessel was sunk in the Straits of Messina (36°54′N 13°35′E) by SM U-39 (Imperial German Navy).

== 21 May ==
List of shipwrecks: 21 May 1916
Ship	State	Description
Birmania	Italy	World War I: The passenger ship was scuttled in the Mediterranean Sea off Marettimo (38°20′N 11°32′E) by SM U-39 (Imperial German Navy). All on board were rescued by Taormina (Italy).
Blue Bell	United States	The barge sank at New Haven, Connecticut, after colliding with RCNE (flag unknown).
Myosotis	France	World War I: The sailing ship was sunk in the Mediterranean Sea 32 nautical miles (59 km) off Port Soller, Mallorca, Spain by SM U-34 (Imperial German Navy). Her crew survived.
Rosalia Madre	Italy	World War I: The sailing ship was sunk in the Straits of Messina by SM U-39 (Imperial German Navy).
Tjømø	Norway	World War I: The cargo ship was scuttled in the Mediterranean Sea 50 nautical miles (93 km) north north west of Formentor, Mallorca, Spain (40°21′N 2°51′E) by SM U-34 (Imperial German Navy). Her crew survived.
Rosalind	Sweden	World War I: The cargo ship struck a mine in the Baltic Sea close to the Stockholm archipelago and sank. The crew was saved.

== 22 May ==
List of shipwrecks: 22 May 1916
Ship	State	Description
Australia	Italy	World War I: The full-rigged ship was scuttled in the Mediterranean Sea 65 nautical miles (120 km) south east of Barcelona (40°23′N 1°50′E) by SM U-34 (Imperial German Navy).
Genista	Italy	World War I: The full-rigged ship was sunk in the Mediterranean Sea off the Balearic Islands, Spain (40°37′N 1°47′E) by SM U-34 (Imperial German Navy).
Istros	Greece	World War I: The cargo ship was sunk in the Mediterranean Sea 40 nautical miles (74 km) of Farragona, Alicante, Spain (40°36′N 1°43′E) by SM U-34 (Imperial German Navy). Her crew survived.
Orealla	Italy	World War I: The full-rigged ship was sunk in the Mediterranean Sea south of Barcelona, Spain (40°24′N 1°53′E) by SM U-34 (Imperial German Navy).
Rhenass	United Kingdom	World War I: The coaster struck a mine placed by SM UC-10 (Imperial German Navy) and sank in the North Sea 9 nautical miles (17 km) east by north of Orfordness, Suffolk (52°08′30″N 1°48′00″E with the loss of six of her crew.
Roberto G.	Italy	World War I: The barque was scuttled in the Mediterranean Sea off the Balearic Islands (40°36′N 1°56′E) by SM U-34 (Imperial German Navy).

== 23 May ==
List of shipwrecks: 23 May 1916
Ship	State	Description
Cornigliano	Italy	World War I: The cargo ship was sunk in the Mediterranean Sea 12 nautical miles (22 km) south of the Columbretes Islands, Spain by SM U-34 (Imperial German Navy). Her crew survived.
Hercules	Italy	World War I: The cargo ship was sunk in the Tyrrhenian Sea 70 nautical miles (130 km) south south west of Genoa (43°18′N 8°30′E) by SM U-39 (Imperial German Navy). Her crew survived.
Maria Porto di Salvezza	Italy	World War I: The sailing vessel was sunk in the Tyrrhenian Sea off Elba by SM U-39 (Imperial German Navy). Her crew survived.
Peresvet	Imperial Russian Navy	The Peresvet-class battleship ran aground off Cape Yrodova. She was refloated on 7 June with assistance from the cruiser Kasagi (Imperial Japanese Navy) and taken in to Maizuru, Japan for repairs.
Regina	Russia	World War I: The barque was sunk in the Mediterranean Sea off the Balearic Islands, Spain by SM U-34 (Imperial German Navy).
Washington	Italy	World War I: The cargo ship was torpedoed and sunk in the Mediterranean Sea off Piombino (42°51′N 9°27′E) by SM U-39 (Imperial German Navy).

== 24 May ==
List of shipwrecks: 24 May 1916
Ship	State	Description
Aurrera	Spain	World War I: The cargo ship was sunk in the Mediterranean Sea off Corsica, Italy (43°16′N 8°25′E) by SM U-39 (Imperial German Navy). Her crew survived.
Zanrak	Denmark	The barque ran aground at Sumboe, Faroe Islands. Her crew were rescued.

== 25 May ==
List of shipwrecks: 25 May 1916
Ship	State	Description
Fratelli Bandiera	Italy	World War I: The cargo ship was sunk in the Mediterranean Sea 40 nautical miles (74 km) south east of Hyères, Var, France (42°23′N 5°28′E) by SM U-39 (Imperial German Navy).
Rita	Italy	World War I: The sailing vessel was sunk in the Mediterranean Sea south of Marseille, Bouches-du-Rhône, France by SM U-39 (Imperial German Navy). Her crew survived.

== 26 May ==
List of shipwrecks: 26 May 1916
Ship	State	Description
Denewood	United Kingdom	World War I: The cargo ship struck a mine and sank in the North Sea off Aldeburgh, Suffolk (52°13′25″N 1°47′00″E). Her crew survived.
El Argentino	United Kingdom	World War I: The cargo ship struck a mine and sank in the North Sea 7 nautical miles (13 km) south east by south of Southwold, Suffolk (52°12′45″N 1°49′10″E). Her crew survived.
Volharding	Belgium	World War I: The barge was scuttled in the North Sea north of the Noord Hinder Lightship (Netherlands) by SM UC-6 (Imperial German Navy).

== 27 May ==
List of shipwrecks: 27 May 1916
Ship	State	Description
Lincairn	United Kingdom	World War I: The collier struck a mine and sank in the North Sea 8 nautical miles (15 km) north by east of the Shipwash Lightship (United Kingdom) (52°08′N 1°53′E). Her crew survived.
Mar Terso	Italy	World War I: The cargo ship was sunk in the Mediterranean Sea off the Balearic Islands, Spain (39°08′N 5°02′E) by SM U-39 (Imperial German Navy). Her crew survived.
Moravia	Italy	World War I: The cargo ship was torpedoed and sunk in the Mediterranean Sea.
Trunkby	United Kingdom	World War I: The collier was shelled and sunk in the Mediterranean Sea 50 nautical miles (93 km) south by east of Mahón, Spain, by SM U-39 (Imperial German Navy). Her crew survived.
SM UC-3	Imperial German Navy	World War I: The Type UC I submarine struck a mine and sank in the North Sea off Zeebrugge, West Flanders, Belgium with the loss of all eighteen crew.

== 28 May ==
List of shipwrecks: 28 May 1916
Ship	State	Description
Lady Ninian	United Kingdom	World War I: The cargo ship was shelled and sunk in the Mediterranean Sea 106 nautical miles (196 km) north east of Algiers, Algeria by SM U-39 (Imperial German Navy) with the loss of a crew member.
St. Louis	France	The schooner foundered in the English Channel. Her crew were rescued by São Miguel (Portugal).

== 29 May ==
List of shipwrecks: 29 May 1916
Ship	State	Description
Baron Vernon	United Kingdom	World War I: The cargo ship was shelled and sunk in the Mediterranean Sea 56 nautical miles (104 km) north east of Algiers (37°37′N 3°58′E) by SM U-39 (Imperial German Navy). Her 24 crew survived.
Elmgrove	United Kingdom	World War I: The cargo ship was shelled and sunk in the Mediterranean Sea 96 nautical miles (178 km) north east of Algiers (38°10′N 4°22′E) by SM U-39 (Imperial German Navy). Her crew survived.
USCGC Mohawk	United States Coast Guard	The cutter ran aground on Bartlett Reef (41.2859°N 072.1348°W) in Long Island Sound. She was refloated, repaired, and returned to service.
Southgarth	United Kingdom	World War I: The cargo ship was scuttled in the Mediterranean Sea 60 nautical miles (110 km) north north east of Algiers (38°12′N 4°09′E) by SM U-39 (Imperial German Navy). Her crew survived.

== 30 May ==
List of shipwrecks: 30 May 1916
Ship	State	Description
Baron Tweedmouth	United Kingdom	World War I: The cargo ship was shelled and sunk in the Mediterranean Sea 25 nautical miles (46 km) east by north of Cape Carbon, Algeria (37°10′N 5°15′E) by SM U-39 (Imperial German Navy). Her crew survived.
Dalegarth	United Kingdom	World War I: The cargo ship was torpedoed and sunk in the Mediterranean Sea 12 nautical miles (22 km) north east of Cape Corbelin, Algeria (37°18′N 4°44′E) by SM U-39 (Imperial German Navy). Her crew survived.
Hermesberg	Italy	World War I: The cargo ship was sunk in the Mediterranean Sea off Bougie, Algeria (37°07′N 5°27′E) by SM U-39 (Imperial German Navy). Her crew survived.
Julia Park	United Kingdom	World War I: The cargo ship was torpedoed and sunk in the Mediterranean Sea 10 nautical miles (19 km) north of Cape Carbon (37°03′N 5°14′E) by SM U-34 (Imperial German Navy). Her crew survived.
Rauma	Norway	World War I: The cargo ship was sunk in the Mediterranean Sea north of Cape Carbon (37°08′N 4°57′E) by SM U-39 (Imperial German Navy). Her crew survived.

== 31 May ==
List of shipwrecks: 31 May 1916
Ship	State	Description
HMS Black Prince	Royal Navy	World War I: Battle of Jutland: The Duke of Edinburgh-class cruiser was shelled and sunk in the North Sea off Jutland, Denmark by SMS Friedrich der Grosse, SMS Nassau, SMS Ostfriesland and SMS Thüringen (all Imperial German Navy) and sank with the loss of all 857 crew.
HMS Defence	Royal Navy	World War I: Battle of Jutland: The Minotaur-class cruiser was shelled and sunk by SMS Derfflinger and four destroyers (all Imperial German Navy) with the loss off all 893 crew.
HMS Indefatigable	Royal Navy	HMS Indefatigable World War I: Battle of Jutland: The Indefatigable-class battlecruiser was shelled and sunk by SMS Von der Tann (Imperial German Navy) and other battleships with the loss of 1,017 of her 1,019 crew.
HMS Invincible	Royal Navy	World War I: Battle of Jutland: The Invincible-class battlecruiser was shelled and sunk by SMS Derfflinger and SMS Lützow (both Imperial German Navy) with the loss of 1,026 of her 1,032 crew.
HMS Nestor	Royal Navy	World War I: Battle of Jutland: the Admiralty M-class destroyer was torpedoed and sunk.
HMS Nomad	Royal Navy	World War I: Battle of Jutland: The Admiralty M-class destroyer was shelled and sunk with the loss of eight of her 80 crew. Survivors were rescued by the Germans and became prisoners of war.
HMS Queen Mary	Royal Navy	World War I: Battle of Jutland: The Queen Mary-class battlecruiser was shelled and sunk by SMS Derfflinger (Imperial German Navy) with the loss of 1,266 of her 1,284 crew. Survivors were rescued by HMS Laurel, HMS Petard and HMS Tipperary (all Royal Navy).
SMS S35	Imperial German Navy	World War I: Battle of Jutland: The S31-class torpedo boat was sunk by Royal Navy battlecruisers.
HMS Shark	Royal Navy	World War I: Battle of Jutland: The Acasta-class destroyer was shelled, torpedoed and sunk by SMS S54 (Imperial German Navy). Six survivors were rescued by a Danish ship.
HMS Tipperary	Royal Navy	World War I: Battle of Jutland: The Faulknor-class destroyer leader was shelled and sunk by SMS Westfalen (Imperial German Navy) with the loss of 185 of her 197 crew.
SMS V27	Imperial German Navy	World War I: Battle of Jutland: The V25-class torpedo boat was sunk by Royal Navy cruisers.
SMS V29	Imperial German Navy	World War I: Battle of Jutland: The V25-class torpedo boat was sunk by HMS Petard (Royal Navy).
SMS V48	Imperial German Navy	World War I: Battle of Jutland: The Grosses Torpedoboot 1913-class torpedo boat was shelled and sunk by HMS Shark, HMS Valiant and another ship (all Royal Navy) with the loss of 90 of her 91 crew.
HMS Warrior	Royal Navy	World War I: Battle of Jutland: The Warrior-class cruiser was shelled and damaged by SMS Derfflinger and four destroyers (all Imperial German Navy). She foundered the next day due to damage sustained. HMS Engadine (Royal Navy) rescued 743 survivors.

== Unknown date ==
List of shipwrecks: Unknown date 1916
Ship	State	Description
Bianca	Germany	World War I: The cargo ship was torpedoed and sunk in the Baltic Sea by an Imperial Russian Navy submarine. Her crew were rescued.
HMS E18	Royal Navy	World War I: The E-class submarine struck a mine and sank in the Baltic Sea off Hiiumaa, Estonia on or after 26 May with the loss of all 31 crew.
Ernest Reyer	France	The barque foundered in the Atlantic Ocean north north west of Ouessant, Finistère on or before 13 May.
Hera	Germany	World War I: The cargo ship was torpedoed and sunk in the Baltic Sea by a Royal Navy submarine. Her crew survived.
Kolga	Germany	World War I: The cargo ship was torpedoed and sunk in the Baltic Sea by an Imperial Russian Navy submarine. Her crew were rescued.
Northa	Germany	The cargo ship was torpedoed and sunk in the Baltic Sea.
