= List of shipwrecks in June 1881 =

The list of shipwrecks in June 1881 includes ships sunk, foundered, grounded, or otherwise lost during June 1881.

== 2 June ==
List of shipwrecks: 2 June 1881
Ship	State	Description
Adam Smith, and Alster	United Kingdom	The steamship Alster collided with the steamship Adam Smith and sank off Happisburgh, Norfolk. All on board were rescued. Alster was on a voyage from Hull, Yorkshire, to Antwerp, Belgium. Adam Smith was severely damaged at the bows. She put in to Great Yarmouth, Norfolk.

== 3 June ==
List of shipwrecks: 3 June 1881
Ship	State	Description
Amoenitas	Germany	The brigantine foundered in the Atlantic Ocean. Her crew survived. She was on a voyage from Aracaju, Brazil to Falmouth, Cornwall, United Kingdom.
Bellona	Germany	The steamship struck a rock off "Haddes". She was on a voyage from Niuzhuang to Shantou, China. She put in to Shanghai for repairs.
Henry Morton	United Kingdom	The steamship collided with Robert Dickenson (United Kingdom) in the River Tyne and was severely damaged.
Ibex	United Kingdom	The ship ran aground in the Danube at Brăila, Romania. She was on a voyage from Brăila to Venice, Italy.

== 4 June ==
List of shipwrecks: 4 June 1881
Ship	State	Description
City of London	United Kingdom	The tug was run into by the barque Leondia (Flag unknown) at Shadwell, Middlesex and was severely damaged.

== 5 June ==
List of shipwrecks: 5 June 1881
Ship	State	Description
Acadia	United Kingdom	The full-rigged ship was wrecked on Ducie Island. Her crew subsequently reached Pitcairn Island in a boat. They were rescued fifteen days afterwards by Edward O'Brien (United States). Acadia was on a voyage from San Francisco, California to Queenstown, County Cork.
Alecto	Malta	The barque ran aground on the Cross Sand, in the North Sea off the coast of Norfolk, United Kingdom. She was on a voyage from Cyprus to Aberdeen, United Kingdom. She was refloated with assistance and taken in to Great Yarmouth, Norfolk.
Mary Coles	United Kingdom	The brigantine was driven ashore and wrecked at Lydd, Kent. Her crew were rescued by rocket apparatus. She was on a voyage from Queenstown to Newcastle upon Tyne, Northumberland.
Mennythorpe	United Kingdom	The steamship ran aground on a reef off Cape Finisterre, Spain and was abandoned by her 23 crew.

== 6 June ==
List of shipwrecks: 6 June 1881
Ship	State	Description
Genitori	Italy	The barque was driven ashore near Roquetas, Spain. She was on a voyage from Tripoli, Ottoman Tripolitania to Cardiff, Glamorgan, United Kingdom.
Nebo	United Kingdom	The steamship ran aground at Huntcliffe, Yorkshire.
Seine	United Kingdom	The steamship was run into by the steamship Prado (Flag unknown) and sank off Godrevy Head, Cornwall. Her crew were rescued by Prado. Seine was on a voyage from Plymouth, Devon to Cardiff, Glamorgan.

== 7 June ==
List of shipwrecks: 7 June 1881
Ship	State	Description
Arncott	United Kingdom	The steamship was driven ashore on Fårö, Sweden. She was on a voyage from Middlesbrough, Yorkshire to Kronstadt, Russia.

== 8 June ==
List of shipwrecks: 8 June 1881
Ship	State	Description
Madeleine	United Kingdom	The steamship sprang a leak and was beached at Penarth, Glamorgan. She was on a voyage from Waterford to Newport, Monmouthshire.

== 9 June ==
List of shipwrecks: 9 June 1881
Ship	State	Description
Bessie Rowe	United Kingdom	The brigantine sprang a leak and was beached at Lepe, Isle of Wight. She was on a voyage from Caernarfon to Hamburg, Germany.
Bulwark	United Kingdom	The ship capsized at Melbourne, Victoria.
Hilda	Sweden	The schooner was sunk by ice in the "Oregrundsgrapen" off Örskär. Her cfew were rescued.
Honour	United Kingdom	The schooner foundered off the Saint-Mathieu Lighthouse, Finistère, France. Her crew were rescued.
Julie	Sweden	The schooner capsized in ice in the "Oregrundsgrapen" off "Klockarbodarbadan". Her crew were rescued.
Malancthon	Sweden	The ship ran aground in the "Oregrundsgrapen".
Margaret	United Kingdom	The schooner collided with the ferry Eastham Fairy (United Kingdom) in the River Mersey and was beached in a waterlogged condition. Margaret was on a voyage from Belfast, County Antrim to Runcorn, Cheshire.

== 10 June ==
List of shipwrecks: 10 June 1881
Ship	State	Description
comet	United Kingdom	The ship ran aground on the South Bishops Rocks. She was on a voyage from Briton Ferry, Glamorgan to Belfast, County Antrim. She was refloated and taken in to Milford Haven, Pembrokeshire in a leaky condition.
Norman	United Kingdom	The steamship was driven ashore 1.5 nautical miles (2.8 km) north of Seaham, County Durham. Her crew were landed. She was on a voyage from Danzig, Germany to Stockton-on-Tees, County Durham. She subsequently broke in two and was a total loss.
Ocean King	United Kingdom	The ship was driven ashore at Arendsburg, Norway. She was on a voyage from Sunderland, County Durham to Kronstadt, Russia.

== 11 June ==
List of shipwrecks: 11 June 1881
Ship	State	Description
Alicante	Spain	The steam coaster was wrecked near "Gibora", Cuba. All on board were rescued.

== 12 June ==
List of shipwrecks: 12 June 1881
Ship	State	Description
Minnie	United Kingdom	The steamship was driven ashore in the Danube downstream of Giurgevo, Romania. She was refloated and resumed her voyage.

== 13 June ==
List of shipwrecks: 13 June 1881
Ship	State	Description
Antonio N.	Italy	The barque ran aground at Berwick upon Tweed, Northumberland, United Kingdom. She was on a voyage from Buenos Aires, Argentina to Berwick upon Tweed. She was refloated.
USS Jeannette	United States Navy	USS Jeanette Jeannette expedition: The Philomel-class gunvessel sank in the Arctic Ocean (77°15′N 154°59′E) after being crushed by ice. Although there was no immediate loss of life, 20 of her 33 crewmen died before reaching safety.

== 14 June ==
List of shipwrecks: 14 June 1881
Ship	State	Description
Amelia	Sweden	The schooner sank at "Norrbadan".
Solway	United Kingdom	The steamship ran aground in the Yenikale Channel.
Three unnamed vessels	Flags unknown	The ships were driven ashore at "Norrbadan".
Two unnamed vessels	Flags unknown	The ships were driven ashore at "Grepen", Sweden.
Two unnamed vessels	Flags unknown	The ships were driven ashore at Svartklubben, Sweden.
Unnamed	Flag unknown	The ship was driven ashore at "Fogstden", Sweden.

== 15 June ==
List of shipwrecks: 15 June 1881
Ship	State	Description
La Sofia	Italy)	The barque was driven ashore at Rangoon, Burma. She was on a voyage from Cardiff, Glamorgan, United Kingdom to Rangoon. She subsequently broke her back and was condemned.
Unnamed	Flag unknown	The schooner ran aground on the Nore.

== 16 June ==
List of shipwrecks: 16 June 1881
Ship	State	Description
Decidido	Portugal	The brig collided with the steamship Lassell (United Kingdom) at Lisbon and was severely damaged.

== 17 June ==
List of shipwrecks: 17 June 1881
Ship	State	Description
Prinses Elisabeth, and an unnamed vessel	Netherlands; United Kingdom	The steamship collided with a Thames barge off Garrison Point, Isle of Sheppey, Kent and was beached on the Cant Edge, in the Thames Estuary 2 nautical miles (3.7 km) off Sheerness, Kent. She was on a voyage from Queenborough, Kent to Vlissingen, Zeeland. Temporary repairs were made andPrinses Elisabeth was refloated the next day with assistance from the tug Sampson (Royal Navy), which took off 30 of her passengers who did not wish to continue their voyage. The Thames barge sank with the presumed loss of both crew.
Rauha	Russia	The barque was driven ashore at Svartklubben, Sweden.
Robert	United Kingdom	The schooner was wrecked at Llanllians Head, Anglesey. Her crew were rescued. She was on a voyage from Runcorn, Cheshire to Fraserburgh, Aberdeenshire.
Stadt Frankfort	France	The barque was driven ashore at Svartklubben.

== 18 June ==
List of shipwrecks: 18 June 1881
Ship	State	Description
Johavet	Norway	The fishing vessel was lost off "Koljugeff". Her crew were rescued.
Lindisfarne	United Kingdom	The steamship ran aground at Trondheim, Norway. She was on a voyage from South Shields, County Durham to Kronstadt, Russia. She was refloated and towed in to Trondheim.

== 19 June ==
List of shipwrecks: 19 June 1881
Ship	State	Description
Vier Gebroeders	Belgium	The fishing vessel sank in the North Sea 97 nautical miles (180 km) north east of Scarborough, Yorkshire. Her crew were rescued by the fishing vessel Septentrion (Belgium).

== 20 June ==
List of shipwrecks: 20 June 1881
Ship	State	Description
Aludra	United Kingdom	The steamship ran aground and sprang a leak at Amsterdam, North Holland, Netherlands. She was on a voyage from Sulina, Romania to Amsterdam.
Hannah Rathkens	Germany	The barque was abandoned in the Atlantic Ocean (29°55′N 77°55′W). Her crew were rescued by the barque Belus (France). Hannah Rathkens was on a voyage from Miragoâne, Haiti to Falmouth, Cornwall, United Kingdom.
Maria P.	Italy	The barque was destroyed by fire at Rangoon, Burma.
Red Rose	United Kingdom	The steamship was driven ashore at Cape Tenezon, Algeria. She was refloated with assistance from the steamship Argentino (United Kingdom) and taken in to Malta, where she arrived on 24 June.

== 25 June ==
List of shipwrecks: 25 June 1881
Ship	State	Description
Amanda	United Kingdom	The ship ran aground on the North Rock, off the coast of County Down and was wrecked. She was on a voyage from Liverpool, Lancashire to Kronstadt, Russia.
Pietro	Italy	The brig collided with the steamship Newnham (United Kingdom) off "Porman" and was severely damaged. She was towed in to Cartagena, Spain by Newnham.

== 26 June ==
List of shipwrecks: 26 June 1881
Ship	State	Description
Othello	United Kingdom	The steamship was severely damaged by fire at Hull, Yorkshire.

== 27 June ==
List of shipwrecks: 27 June 1881
Ship	State	Description
Alpha	United Kingdom	The schooner was run into by the steamship Travancore (United Kingdom) in the River Tyne and was severely damaged.
America	United Kingdom	The steamship ran aground in the "Hydrographer Group". She was on a voyage from Tianjin, China to Kuchinotsu, Japan. She was refloated but consequently foundered in the Yellow Sea (34°10′N 123°08′E). Her crew survived.

== 29 June ==
List of shipwrecks: 29 June 1881
Ship	State	Description
J. P. Taylor	United Kingdom	The schooner struck rocks at Wexford and sprang a leak. She was on a voyage from Newport, Monmouthshire to Wexford.

== Unknown date ==
List of shipwrecks: Unknown date in June 1881
Ship	State	Description
Ala	Norway	The barque ran aground on the Lillegrunden, in the Baltic Sea. She was on a voyage from Riga, Russia to a Dutch port. She was refloated with the assistance of a steamship and taken in to Copenhagen, Denmark.
Alblasserdam	Netherlands	The ship was lost off "Cape la Roque", Brazil. She was on a voyage from Rotterdam, South Holland to Java, Netherlands East Indies.
Alvina	Russia	The schooner was driven ashore and wrecked at Visby, Sweden. Her crew were rescued. She was on a voyage from Saint Petersburg to Schiedam, South Holland.
Baron Bentinck	Netherlands	The steamship ran aground off Bawen, Netherlands East Indies before 9 June. Salvage attempts were unsuccessful and she was condemned.
Blackhalls	United Kingdom	The ship was driven ashore in Baracouta Bay. She was refloated and taken in to Nicholaieff, Russia, where she arrived on 15 June.
Breton	France	The steamship ran aground on the Cani Rocks, in the Mediterranean Sea off the coast of Tunisia. She was on a voyage from Ergasteria, Ottoman Empire to Antwerp, Belgium. She was refloated with assistance from the frigate Cassard (French Navy), which towed her in to Bizerte, Algeria.
Catharina Elisabeth	Netherlands	The schooner was driven ashore and wrecked at Libava, Courland Governorate. She was on a voyage from Newburgh, Fife, United Kingdom to Kotka, Russia.
Clyde	United Kingdom	The steamship ran aground on the Swellies, in the Menai Strait. She was on a voyage from Liverpool, Lancashire to Cardiff, Glamorgan. She was refloated and beached at Caernarfon, where she was repaired. Clyde resumed her voyage on 23 June.
Davina	United Kingdom	The ship was abandoned at sea with the loss of two of her crew. Survivors were rescued by Cardiganshire (United Kingdom). Davina was on a voyage from Surabaya, Netherlands East Indies to Falmouth, Cornwall.
Deodata	Norway	The barque was abandoned at sea. She was on a voyage from Cardiff to Kronstadt, Russia.
Fermina de Veta	Spain	The ship was lost at Bilbao. Her crew were rescued.
Flora	Austria-Hungary	The barque was wrecked on the Morant Cays, Jamaica. Her crew were rescued.
Flora P. Stafford	United Kingdom	The barque was run down by Haytien (flag unknown) and abandoned. Her crew were rescued by Haytien, but her captain died within an hour. Flora P. Stafford was on a voyage from Bordeaux, Gironde, France to the Hampton Roads, Virginia, United States.
Foam	United Kingdom	The fishing smack struck a sunken wreck off the Dudgeon Sandbank, in the North Sea and foundered. Her crew survived.
Franconia	United States	The ship was wrecked at San Francisco, California. Her crew were rescued.
Hannah Rathkens	United Kingdom	The ship was driven ashore on Castle Island, New York, United States. She was on a voyage from Haiti to Falmouth, Cornwall. She was refloated with assistance.
J. C. Williams	United Kingdom	The barque ran aground on the Skagen Reef, in the Øresund. She was on a voyage from New York to Copenhagen. She was refloated on 6 June and resumed her voyage.
Liburian	United Kingdom	The ship capsized at Galle, Ceylon.
Masoo	Germany	The barque foundered before 6 June. Her crew were rescued.
Mathilde	Norway	The barque was abandoned in the Atlantic Ocean. Her crew were rescued by Alice ( Canada.
Minnie Knapp	United Kingdom	The ship was driven ashore and wrecked on Iona, Inner Hebrides. She was on a voyage from Glenarm, County Antrim to Newcastle upon Tyne, Northumberland.
Nettie Margarethe	Norway	The barque was wrecked on Île Saint-Paul, Quebec, Canada before 12 June with the loss of six of her eleven crew. She was on a voyage from London, United Kingdom to Miramichi, New Brunswick, Canada.
Newminster	United Kingdom	The steamship ran aground at Saint John, New Brunswick. She was on a voyage from Saint John to Penarth, Glamorgan.
Nieuwe Diep	Germany	The barque was wrecked in the Krishna River with some loss of life.
Norway	United Kingdom	The steamship ran aground near Passage West, County Cork. She was on a voyage from Brăila, Romania to Queenstown, County Cork.
Pax	Netherlands	The ship foundered in the Baltic Sea. Her crew survived. She was on a voyage from Lübeck, Germany to Saint Petersburg.
Richard Wallace	France	The barque was wrecked at the mouth of the "Debrica River", Sierra Leone.
Rokeby	United Kingdom	The steamship was driven ashore at Sandhammaren, Norway.
Ross	Norway	The schooner was driven ashore at "Fahludd", Gotland, Sweden. She was on a voyage from Riga, Russia to Nantes, Loire-Inférieure, France.
Santorin	United Kingdom	The ship collided with the barque Cohanim (Germany) and was severely damaged. Santorin was on a voyage from Leith, Lothian to Kronstadt. She put in to Karlskrona, Sweden for repairs.
Unnamed	United States	The coaster was run into by Lothair (United States) and sank at Philadelphia, Pennsylvania. Her crew were rescued.
