= Falo =

Falo may refer to:

- Falo, Mali
- Falo Mgudlwa, Xhosa chief
- FALO, a variant of the FN FAL, a Belgian battle rifle
- FALO alliance, an Asia-Pacific business association that included Groupe DSO
- Faló, the main character in the Swedish comic strip Uti vår hage

== See also ==
- Fälö by, a village in Uppsala County, Sweden
