= 2015 Russian submarine wreck discovery =

Imperial Russian submarine wrecked off the Swedish coast

Coordinates: 60°00′N 18°56′E

In 2015, Swedish diving group Ocean X Team found the wreck of what initially appeared to be a foreign mini-submarine off the east coast of Sweden.

The Swedish Armed Forces subsequently issued a statement that it was "most likely" a Russian Som-class submarine that went down with all hands in 1916.

== Find ==
On 27 July 2015, it was reported that a foreign mini-submarine, 20 m (66 ft) long and 3 m (9.8 ft) in diameter, had been located the previous week by Swedish diving group Ocean X Team, led by Dennis Åberg. The submarine was found 2.75 km (1.48 nmi; 1.71 mi) offshore on the east coast of central Sweden. The group had received coordinates for where to search from Icelandic company Ixplorer.

According to the divers who found the submarine, it was a modern model and it appeared to be intact, suggesting that the remains of the crew may still be on board. The hull was marked with Cyrillic letters. The pictures from the wreck showed that the yellow submarine was standing on the sea bottom with its tower pointing straight up. The diving group informed the Swedish Armed Forces on Monday 27 July 2015, and video material from the wreckage was handed over for analysis. The hull of the wreck features the "hard sign" Ъ in the final position. Since this usage was discontinued during the 1917 orthographic reform, it indicated that the ship predated the Soviet era.

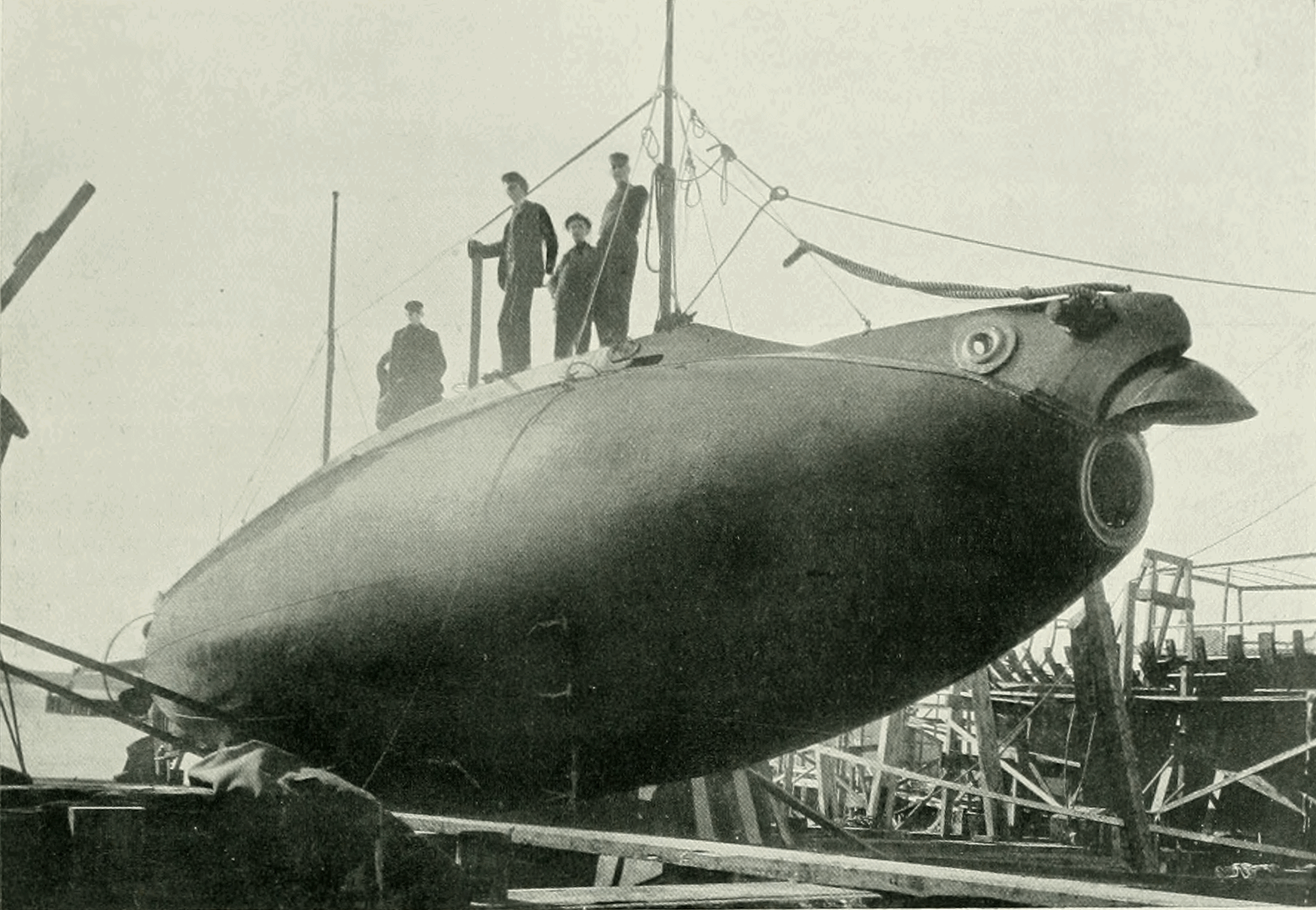
Som (as Fulton) in 1902

On 28 July 2015, a statement was released by the Swedish Armed Forces public relations office that stated that analysis of the video footage and other evidence indicated that the wreck was "most likely" that of the Imperial Russian Navy Som-class submarine Som (Сомъ). Som sank with all hands on active service in 1916 after a collision with the steamship Ångermanland in the Sea of Åland, somewhere between Arholma and the Svartklubben lighthouse. According to several sources who previously worked with submarine analyses for the Swedish Armed Forces, the location of the submarine had been known for at least one year.

As of 28 July 2015, the Swedish Armed Forces considered the wreck to be of historical or marine archaeological interest rather than military, and handed over the case to the Ministry for Foreign Affairs. The ministry consequently informed the Russian embassy in Stockholm.

== Ocean X Team ==
The Ocean X diving group is a privately owned salvage operator not affiliated with the Swedish military. It previously found an American Boeing B-17 Flying Fortress in 1992, and 2,400 bottles of 1907 Heidsieck & Co champagne in 1994.

The wreck was discovered by using an ROV (remote operated vehicle) called V8 Sii from Ocean Modules in Åtvidaberg. The ROV was equipped with a grapple, a video camera and a Blueview sonar made by Teledyne.

== See also ==
- List of shipwrecks in May 1916
- S-7, another Russian/Soviet submarine sunk in Swedish waters
