= Listed buildings in Uppsala County =

There are 65 listed buildings (Swedish: byggnadsminne) in Uppsala County.

== Enköping Municipality ==
Image	Name	Premise	Number of buildings	Year built	Architect	Coordinates	ID
	Ekolsunds previously värdshus	Ekolsund 3:7	1			59.65269°N 17.36559°E	21300000013342
	Ekolsunds slott	Ekolsund 1:227 previously 1:102	3			59.65075°N 17.36639°E	21300000013350
	Gryta majorsboställe	Gryta 5:3	3			59.73956°N 17.34746°E	21300000013330
	Grönsö slott	Grönsö 1:1	2			59.47225°N 17.24542°E	21300000013705
	Härnevi kvarn, såg	Stora Härnevi 2:2, 11:1; Kylsta 8:2	10			59.73355°N 17.05979°E	21300000013363
	Kvekgården	Kvek 2:34, 2:36	10			59.72710°N 17.26680°E	21300000013318
	Landsberga översteboställe	Landsberga 1:1	5			59.74088°N 17.18004°E	21300000013308
	Salnecke slott	Salnecke 1:10	4			59.73921°N 17.33841°E	21300000013701
	Utöhus	Utö 2:1 previously Utöhus 1:1	1			59.47294°N 17.23204°E	21300000013520
	Veckholms gamla prästgård	Veckholm 1:8 previously 1:1	3			59.52292°N 17.32079°E	21300000013537

== Heby Municipality ==
Image	Name	Premise	Number of buildings	Year built	Architect	Coordinates	ID
	Huddungeby, Anders Olsgården	Huddungeby 3:19	2			60.04171°N 16.98149°E	21300000013101
	Harbonäs säteri	Harbonäs 2:1	1			60.13771°N 17.29727°E	21300000013107
	Huddungeby, Jan Ers-gården	Huddungeby 3:20	4			60.04174°N 16.98228°E	21300000013105
	Östervåla gästgivargård	Östervåla-Åby 8:69 previously 8:9	1	1795		60.18349°N 17.18687°E	21300000013096

== Håbo Municipality ==
Image	Name	Premise	Number of buildings	Year built	Architect	Coordinates	ID
	Biskops-Arnö	Biskops-Arnö 1:1	9			59.66257°N 17.48658°E	21300000013578
	Skoklosters slott	Skokloster 2:4 previously Skokloster 2:1	5			59.70308°N 17.61941°E	21300000013580

== Knivsta Municipality ==
Image	Name	Premise	Number of buildings	Year built	Architect	Coordinates	ID
	Flottsunds fyr	Kungshamn 1-5:1	1			59.78620°N 17.65596°E	21000001480420
	Krusenbergs herrgård	Krusenberg 1:58, 1:1; Ga:1	5			59.73500°N 17.64665°E	21300000013254
	Mora stenar	Mora 1:1	1			59.79775°N 17.78078°E	21300000018416
	Skottsila previously mönsterskrivarboställe	Skottsila 2:7 previously 2:1	4			59.69695°N 17.78111°E	21300000013264

== Tierp Municipality ==
Image	Name	Premise	Number of buildings	Year built	Architect	Coordinates	ID
	Söderfors bruk	Söderfors bruk 1:1, 1:158; Jörsön 3:1, 9:1	95			60.38460°N 17.23856°E	21300000013373
	Griggebo såg	Griggebo 1:17	1			60.46960°N 17.87104°E	21300000013354
	Karlholmsbruks Lancashiresmedja; Kvarn; Blåsmaksin; Våghus	Karlholm 1:48-49, 1:53	4			60.52231°N 17.63789°E	21300000013494
	Lars-Larsgården	Munga 5:9	1			60.30851°N 17.41109°E	21300000013541
	Lövstabruk	Skärsättra 1:20 etc.;previously Skärsättra 1:2 m.fl	122			60.40813°N 17.87879°E	21300000013379
	Åkerby bruks klockstapel	Österlövsta-Åkerby 10:28	1			60.41634°N 17.76449°E	21300000013509
	Örbyhus slott	Örbyhus 1:8	29			60.20026°N 17.70620°E	21300000013543

== Uppsala Municipality ==
Image	Name	Premise	Number of buildings	Year built	Architect	Coordinates	ID
	Televerkets hus	Dragarbrunn 30:5	1			59.85757°N 17.64236°E	21300000013404
	Vetenskapssocietetens hus, Schefferska huset	Fjärdingen 15:1 previously Disa 8	2			59.85881°N 17.63215°E	21300000013715
	Geijersgården	Fjärdingen 19:3	3			59.85576°N 17.63041°E	21300000013449
	Universitetshuset, Universitetsparken, Uppsala|Universitetsparken, Gustavianum, Ekermanska huset	Fjärdingen 1:9 previously S:t Eriks torg 2	3			59.85799°N 17.63099°E	21300000013673
	Kemicum, Fysicum, Philologicum, Prefektbostaden	Kåbo 14:3, 14:4;previously 14:1-14:2	5			59.85346°N 17.62660°E	21300000013552
	Akademikvarnen	Fjärdingen 1:12 previously Holmen 4	4			59.85895°N 17.63459°E	21300000013441
	Altomta gård	Altomta 1:1, 2:1, 3:1	5			60.02183°N 17.69780°E	21300000013301
	Botaniska trädgården	Kåbo 25:1 previously stä 657	3			59.85219°N 17.62816°E	21300000013610
	Carolina Rediviva	Kåbo 15:1	1			59.85491°N 17.63097°E	21300000013613
	Dekanhuset	Fjärdingen 24:1	1			59.85746°N 17.63268°E	21300000013614
	Domkapitalhuset	Fjärdingen 22:1	1			59.85837°N 17.63490°E	21300000013391
	Domtrapphuset	Fjärdingen 22:1	1			59.85828°N 17.63510°E	21300000013387
	Ekeby by (Vänge-Ekeby 6:1	del av), 6:2, 6:4, 6:5, 7:2; Samfälld mark	41			59.84897°N 17.45179°E	21300000013485
	Focksta kvarn	Hagby-Focksta 6:1	7			59.79395°N 17.36977°E	21300000016687
	Ecclesiasticum	Fjärdingen 22:1	1			59.85853°N 17.63326°E	21300000013681
	Gymnastikhuset i Uppsala	Fjärdingen 34:1;previously Stadsträdgården 34:1	1			59.85375°N 17.63978°E	21300000013473
	Ihregården	Fjärdingen 19:4	3			59.85598°N 17.63015°E	21300000013458
	Katedralskolans previously rektorsgård	Luthagen 75:1	1			59.86048°N 17.62656°E	21300000013467
	Konsistoriehuset	Fjärdingen 22:2; fd 22:1	1			59.85841°N 17.63244°E	21300000013615
	Kvarteret Rosendal	Fjärdingen 13:2	1			59.85897°N 17.62892°E	21300000013415
	Kvarteret Munken, Laboratorium Chemicum	Fjärdingen 30:3 previously Munken 11	4			59.85539°N 17.63968°E	21300000013620
	Landshövdingens stall	Kåbo 5:3 previously 5:1	1			59.85168°N 17.63396°E	21300000013684
	Lena gamla sockenstugan	Lena 1:46 previously Prästgården 1:46	1			60.01297°N 17.72201°E	21300000013710
	Linnéhuset i Sävja	Sävja 1:55	8			59.81960°N 17.70111°E	21300000013261
	Linnés Hammarby	Danmarks-Hammarby 5:1	6			59.81783°N 17.77603°E	21300000013598
	Linnéträdgården	Dragarbrunn 4:7 previously Örtedalen 7	4			59.86228°N 17.63429°E	21300000013621
	Lägenheten Lugnet	Kåbo 5:1	2			59.85071°N 17.63289°E	21300000013437
	S1)	Kronåsen 1:15	9			59.84083°N 17.64999°E	21300000013424
	Regnellianum	Fjärdingen 29:3	1			59.85549°N 17.63761°E	21300000013652
	Salsta slott	Lena-Salsta 1:5	9			60.04742°N 17.74085°E	21300000013268
	Skuttunge prästgård	Skuttunge 10:4 previously 10:1	8			59.99492°N 17.50222°E	21300000013297
	Skytteanum	Fjärdingen 26:4 previously Domen 10	2			59.85786°N 17.63509°E	21300000013720
	Slottsbiografen	Fjärdingen 27:1	1			59.85629°N 17.63476°E	21300000013420
	Ställverket vid Uppsala centralstation	Dragarbrunn 32:1	1			59.85591°N 17.65085°E	21300000021308
	Uppsala hälsobrunn, Eklundshof	Kronåsen 1:27 previously 1:17	8			59.84311°N 17.64854°E	21300000013431
	Uppsala slott	Fjärdingen 33:1	1			59.85359°N 17.63543°E	21300000013609
	Uppsala stationshus (Uppsala central)	Dragarbrunn 32:1	1			59.85878°N 17.64588°E	21300000013384
	Vaksalaskolan	Fålhagen 12:1	1			59.86112°N 17.64823°E	21300000013474
	Vice pastorshuset	Fjärdingen 22:1	1			59.85854°N 17.63443°E	21300000013392
	Viks slott	Viks mur 1:1	2			59.73614°N 17.46204°E	21300000013259
	Villa Göth	Kåbo 49:8	1			59.84397°N 17.62979°E	21300000013463
	Vänge prästgård	Vänge 2:28	4			59.85714°N 17.43095°E	21300000013482
	kv. Lagerträdet)	Kåbo 34:12	2			59.84969°N 17.62404°E	21300000013461
	Observatorieparken	Luthagen 62:4 previously 62:1	13			59.85736°N 17.62236°E	21300000013623
	Ärkebiskopsgården	Fjärdingen 21:1	4			59.85722°N 17.63134°E	21300000013481

1. Backmanska huset i Uppsala

== Älvkarleby Municipality ==
Image	Name	Premise	Number of buildings	Year built	Architect	Coordinates	ID
	K 0188 (Marma läger)	Älvsäter 1:3	22			60.48251°N 17.42668°E	21300000013661

== Östhammar Municipality ==
Image	Name	Premise	Number of buildings	Year built	Architect	Coordinates	ID
	Dannemora gruvor Gruvlaven; Sovrings- Anrikningsverket; Gruvstugan; Transportbandet	Harvik 4:28	2			60.20423°N 17.86114°E	21300000019900
	Blåbandshuset	Börstils-Söderby 4:13	2			60.29489°N 18.40507°E	21300000013504
	Djurstens fyrplats	Västerbyn 3:2	1			60.36902°N 18.40120°E	21300000013631
	Dannemora gruvor Previously Gruvarbetartorpet	Gryttjom 2:12	4			60.19500°N 17.81795°E	21300000013326
	Forsmarks bruk	Forsmark 3:45 previously 3:17	41			60.37107°N 18.15327°E	21300000013575
	Gimo herrgård Inspektorsbostaden vid Gimo bruk	Gimo 13:3, 11:186, 15:1, 8:89	10			60.17878°N 18.17175°E	21300000013512
	Granbo gård	Norrskedika 5:16	5			60.28981°N 18.32889°E	21300000013311
	Dannemora gruvor Nordschaktlaven	Films-Österby 3:5	1			60.20947°N 17.86614°E	21300000013561
	Dannemora gruvor Norra maskin	Films-Österby 3:5	1			60.20826°N 17.86514°E	21300000019897
	Dannemora gruvor, Triewalds maskinhus	Harvik 4:28	1			60.20380°N 17.85563°E	21300000019901
	Örskärs fyrplats	Fyrtäppan 1:1; Norrboda 25:1	8			60.52585°N 18.37364°E	21300000013634
	Österby bruk	Österbybruk 1:255, 1:332, 1:305, 1:355, 1:116	78			60.19483°N 17.90287°E	21300000013565
