= Ellan =

Coordinates: 60°12′N 18°44′E

- Village
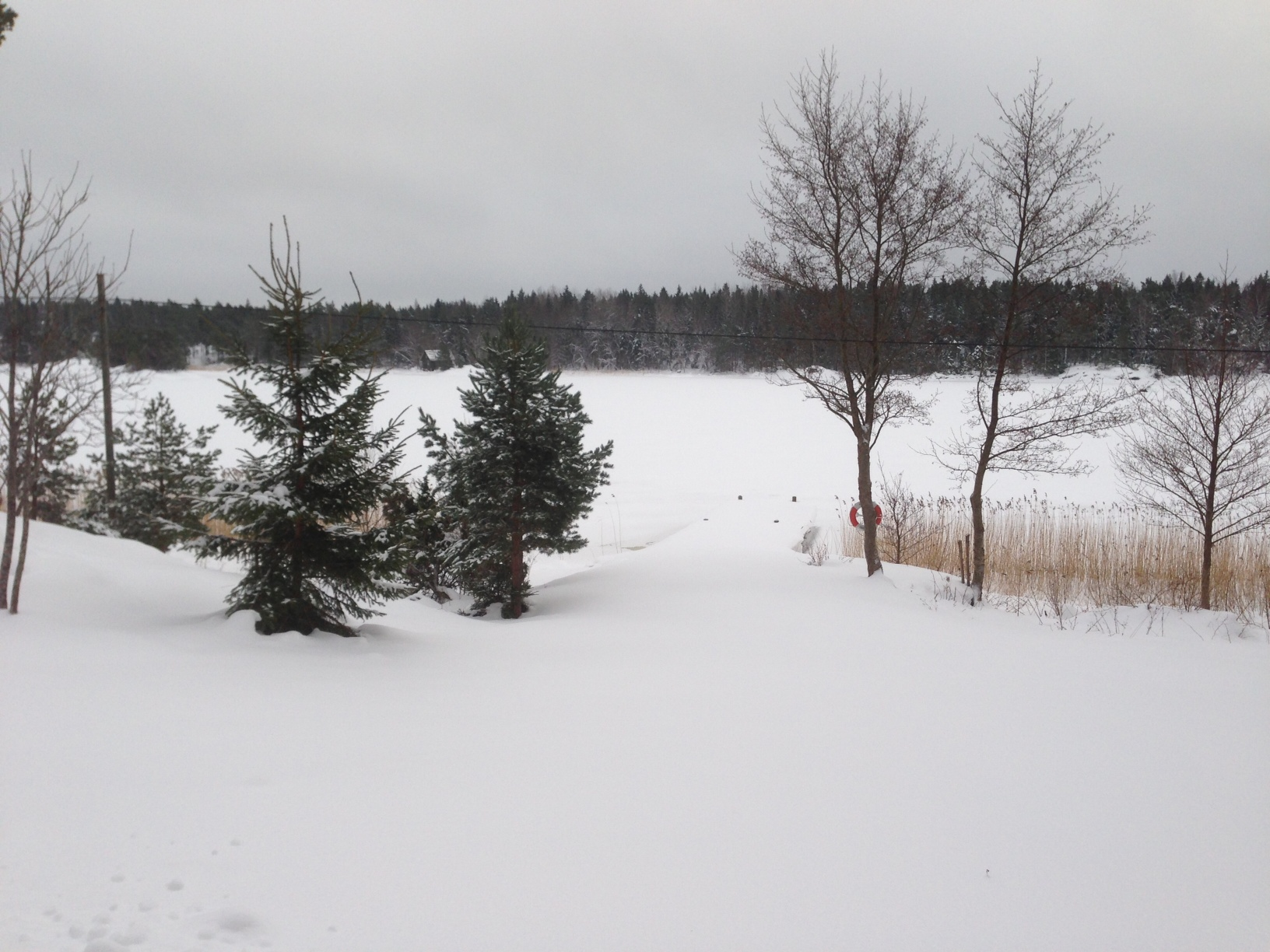
- A jetty in Ellan on December 26, 2012.
- Interactive map of Ellan
- Country: Sweden
- County: Stockholm
- Municipality: Norrtälje
- Time zone: UTC+1 (CET)
  - Summer (DST): UTC+2 (CEST)

Ellan is a village located on Singö in the north of Stockholm County.

== Public Transport ==
SL's bus line 637 goes a few times daily from Ellan to Norrtälje. Ellan is in fact SL's northernmost stop.
