= SS Davanger =

Steam cargo ship

History

Norway
- Name: Davanger
- Owner: Rolph Coal & Navigation Co. (1916); Westfal-Larsen (1916–1917)
- Builder: Union Iron Works, San Francisco
- Cost: $750,000
- Yard number: 126
- Laid down: 17 December 1915
- Launched: 18 June 1916
- Sponsored by: Annie Rolph
- Christened: Annette Rolph
- Commissioned: 29 July 1916
- Maiden voyage: 12 August 1916
- Home port: San Francisco (1916); Bergen (1916–1917)
- Identification: US official number 214301; code letters LGFH (1916); code letters WLKG (1916–1917)
- Fate: Sunk, 14 March 1917

General characteristics
- Type: Cargo ship
- Tonnage: 5,876 GRT; 3,716 NRT; 9,300 DWT
- Length: 399.7 ft (121.8 m)
- Beam: 56.2 ft (17.1 m)
- Depth: 29.2 ft (8.9 m)
- Installed power: 2,600 ihp, 498 Nhp
- Propulsion: General Electric Co. steam turbine, double reduction geared to one screw
- Speed: 12.0 knots (13.8 mph; 22.2 km/h)

Davanger was a steam cargo ship built in 1915–1916 by the Union Iron Works of San Francisco for James Rolph Jr. While under construction, the ship was sold three times, eventually being acquired by Westfal-Larsen of Bergen to be used in tramp trade. The vessel operated between the East Coast of the United States and Europe during her short career and was sunk on her third trip in March 1917 by the German submarine UB-27.

== Design and construction ==
Early in 1915 James Rolph Jr., mayor of San Francisco, and owner of two shipping companies, Rolph, Hind & Co. and Rolph Coal and Navigation Company, placed an order with Union Iron Works to build a new vessel of approximately 9,000 deadweight tonnage. With Germany conducting unrestricted submarine warfare in early parts of 1915, European ship-owners suffered considerable shipping losses. As a result, the prices for new and existing ships and freight fees skyrocketed prompting some entrepreneurs to enter the highly speculative shipbuilding business. When the steamer was nearly complete, she was bought by George W. McNear, giving Rolph a profit of approximately $112,500. Encouraged by the success of his speculative play, Rolph placed another order with Union Iron Works to build an identical vessel in October 1915.

The new vessel was laid down at the shipbuilder's yard on 17 December 1915 (yard number 126) with mayor Rolph himself driving in the first rivet to fasten the keel. Barely a month into construction, in January 1916, Rolph sold the vessel to Theodore B. Wilcox, wealthy Portland mill-owner for approximately $900,000−1,000,000. Shortly thereafter, Rolph reacquired the ship from Wilcox for $1,350,000 in March 1916 and then proceeded to sell the freighter to Norwegian ship operator Westfal-Larsen for $1,750,000. The vessel was launched on 18 June 1916, with Annie Rolph, wife of James Rolph Jr., being the sponsor. As the ship slipped into the water, she was christened Annette Rolph in honor of James Rolph's wife.

Similar to two previously built ships, SS Pacific and SS Eurana, the vessel had two main decks and was built on the Isherwood principle of longitudinal framing providing extra strength to the body of the vessel. The freighter had her machinery situated amidships and had all the modern machinery fitted for quick loading and unloading of the cargo. The vessel was equipped with wireless apparatus and had electric lights installed along the decks.

As built, the ship was 399.7 feet (121.8 m) long (between perpendiculars) and 56.2 feet (17.1 m) abeam, and had a depth of 29.2 feet (8.9 m). Annette Rolph was assessed at 5,876 GRT and 3,716 NRT and had deadweight tonnage of approximately 9,300. The vessel had a steel hull and a single steam turbine rated at 2,600 ihp, double-reduction geared to a single screw propeller that moved the ship at up to 12 knots (14 mph; 22 km/h). The steam for the engine was supplied by three Scotch marine boilers fitted for oil fuel.

The sea trials were held on 25 July 1916 in the San Francisco Bay, during which the ship performed satisfactorily. Following their successful completion, the steamer was officially transferred to her owners on July 29 and renamed Davanger.

== Operational history ==
Upon delivery Davanger was immediately chartered by her new owners to transport a large cargo of grain to the United Kingdom. The freighter was chartered for the highest freight rate ever charged up to that moment for grain shipment from San Francisco and proceeded to load approximately 7,800 tons of her cargo. Before departure two large Norwegian flags were painted on both sides of the vessel to clearly show her neutral status. Davanger then departed San Francisco on 12 August 1916 with full cargo of barley bound for Manchester. The vessel passed through the Panama Canal on 25–27 August 1916 and arrived at Liverpool on 15 September successfully concluding her maiden voyage. Upon unloading the steamer left Manchester on October 7 and arrived at New York on October 23. While there Davanger loaded part cargo, and then continued on to Baltimore five days later. Upon arrival she embarked a cargo of steel rails and sailed from Baltimore on November 5 bound for La Pallice. After an uneventful journey the ship reached her destination on December 4.

=== Sinking ===
Davanger left La Pallice on 28 December 1916 and safely reached New York on 11 January 1917. The vessel loaded almost 8,000 tons of barley consigned to Nederlandsche Gist- en Spiritusfabriek and left New York on January 22, bound for Rotterdam. The freighter was under command of captain Einar Hille and had a crew of thirty four. Davanger reached The Downs in the evening of February 6 where she was to be inspected before proceeding further. On February 10 the ship was allowed to sail, but soon after her departure she was stopped and ordered to return to the Downs and await further instructions. Davanger remained berthed at the Downs for over a month.

Finally, on March 10 she was released and allowed to leave the anchorage the next morning and proceed all the way to Rotterdam. The next day a pilot arrived but didn't come on board and guided the ship to Black Deep where she dropped her anchor and spent a night. In the morning of March 12 the ship was allowed to sail and proceeded as far as the Sunk lightship where the pilot left the vessel, but soon after unexpectedly was ordered to return to Black Deep and anchor there until further notice. Davanger turned around and spent 13 March anchored at Black Deep. On March 14 the freighter was again released and departed in the morning passing by Outer Gabbard lightship and then setting course directly to Hook of Holland. The weather was very hazy with low visibility, not exceeding one mile according to captain's estimate. At about 17:00 the soundings were taken and the ship was found to be travelling in approximately 18 1/2 fathoms (111 ft; 33.8 m) of water. Shortly afterwards the first shot was heard and an explosion observed in the distance, quickly followed by two more. Two more shots landed and exploded about twenty feet from the ship's port side and finally the sixth shot exploded right in front of the ship's bow. The captain immediately ordered to stop the engines with the ship being roughly 40 nautical miles (74 km) N47°W from the Hook of Holland. After a few minutes the crew was able to observe a submarine appearing from the port side flashing "Abandon ship instantly" signal. Captain Hille went aboard the submarine carrying the ship's papers, which were all confiscated by the submarine's commander. Captain Hille argued that his vessel is carrying cargo from a neutral country to a neutral country using a neutral vessel, but to no avail. The Germans sent a crew aboard Davanger armed with a sledgehammer and scuttling charges. Meanwhile, the freighter's crew was ordered into lifeboats and directed to move away from the scene as quickly as possible.

The entire crew found themselves in three lifeboats and immediately started rowing towards Dutch coast. After several hours they came in view of the land, and soon after encountered Dutch patrol vessel, Kapitein de Voogt, who took them on board. The survivors then were taken to Hellevoetsluis where they were put aboard HNLMS Buffel and provided with food and temporary accommodations.

After the end of the World War I it was discovered that Davanger was scuttled by the German submarine UB-27.
