= Gräsö =

Island in Sweden

'Gräsö
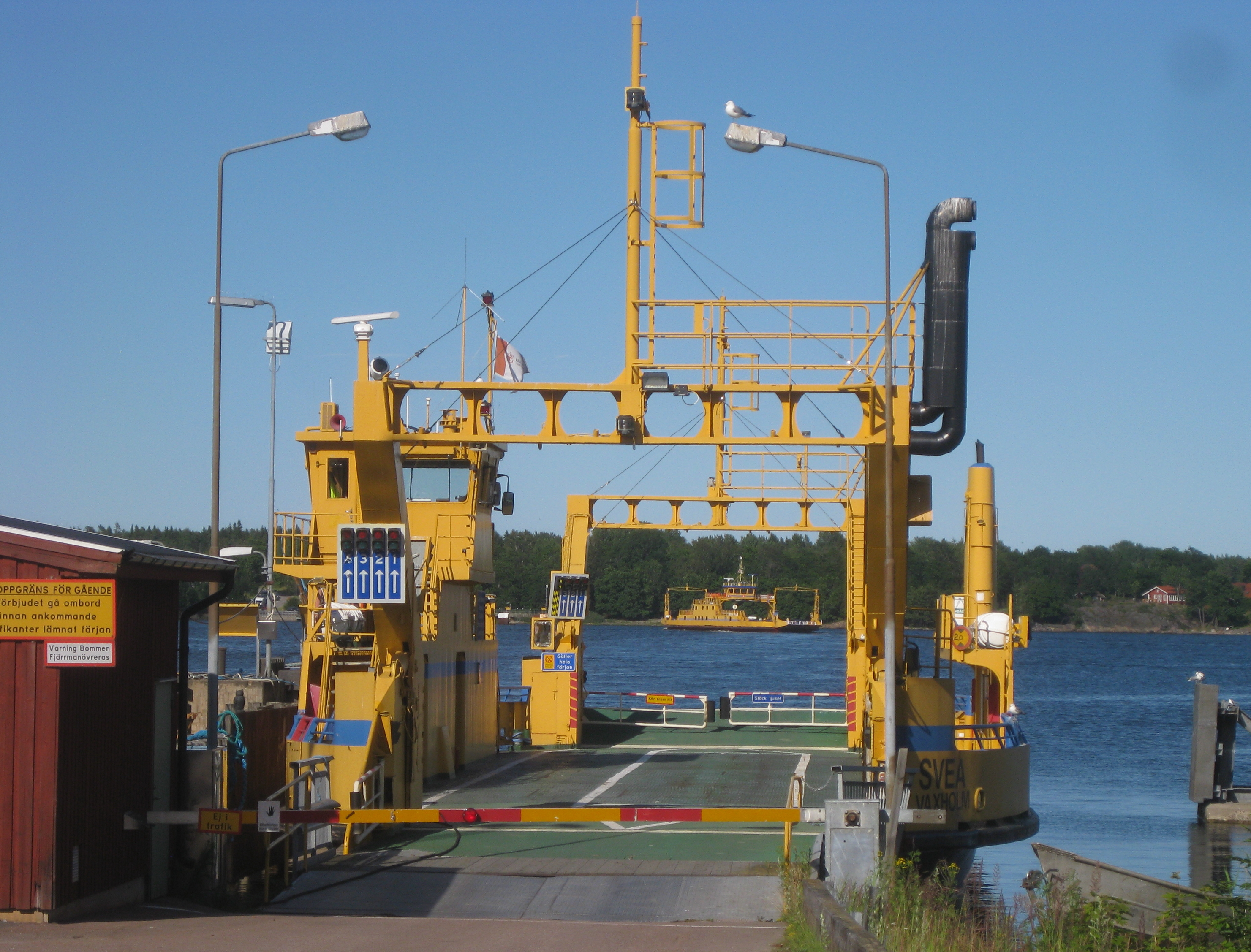
- Ferries between Gräsö (background) and Öregrund

- Location within Sweden

Geography
- Coordinates: 60.37°N 18.45°E
- Adjacent to: Gulf of Bothnia
- Area: 93.26 km^{2} (36.01 sq mi)

Administration
- Sweden
- County: Uppsala
- Municipality: Östhammar

Demographics
- Population: 636 (2020)

Gräsö is an island in Östhammar Municipality, off the coast of Uppland province on the eastern coast of Sweden. It is also the name of a village on the island which lies at the southern end of the Gulf of Bothnia. The island has an area of 93.26 square kilometres (36.01 sq mi) and a population of about 600. The island has a mixture of fields and woodland. It is a popular summer resort.

== Location ==
Gräsö and the smaller island of Örskär to the north are the most northerly of the Roslagen islands, the northern part of the Stockholm archipelago. Gräsö may be reached by ferry from Öregrund on the mainland to the west. The island has a gently rolling terrain with woods mixed with cultivated fields and pasture. There is abundant wildlife including fox, badger, deer and moose. Sea eagles nest on the island.

== History ==
In the past the people lived mainly on fishing, hunting and farming. There is a graveyard from the Viking Age in the grazed pasture to the east of Gräsö gård, with 55 graves. This was probably beside a trading post that later gained a more settled farming population practicing arable farming and raising cattle. In 1548 King Gustav Vasa, known as Gustav I of Sweden, evicted the farmers from the region and founded a new estate at Gräsö gård. In the early 1600s the farmstead was converted into a manor.

Gräsö Church was founded in 1695 and consecrated in 1697. In 1719 the Russians raided the island, looting and burning all the farm buildings. A relic from that time is an altar in Klockarhagen where the Russians held their religious services. The church sacristy was built in 1753 as part of the reconstruction after Russian raids of 1719. The church was restored in 1997 for its 300th anniversary.

== Today ==
As of 2013 there were about 800 permanent residents, but in the summer the population rises as many visitors come to stay for their holidays. The island has a kindergarten and an elementary school for students up to grade 3. There are many small businesses in the agriculture and handicraft industries. Visitor facilities include hostels and camping. There is a family campground with a restaurant and miniature golf, craft and curio shops and a small market.

Gräsö gård is now a nature reserve owned by the municipality, near to the ferry landing. It includes hiking trails, meadows with many flowers, rocks and woods, and picnic areas. Some of the meadows are fenced off, and cows graze in others. There is a 28-bed hostel. The main building was built at the turn of the century after a fire in 1890.

== Gallery ==
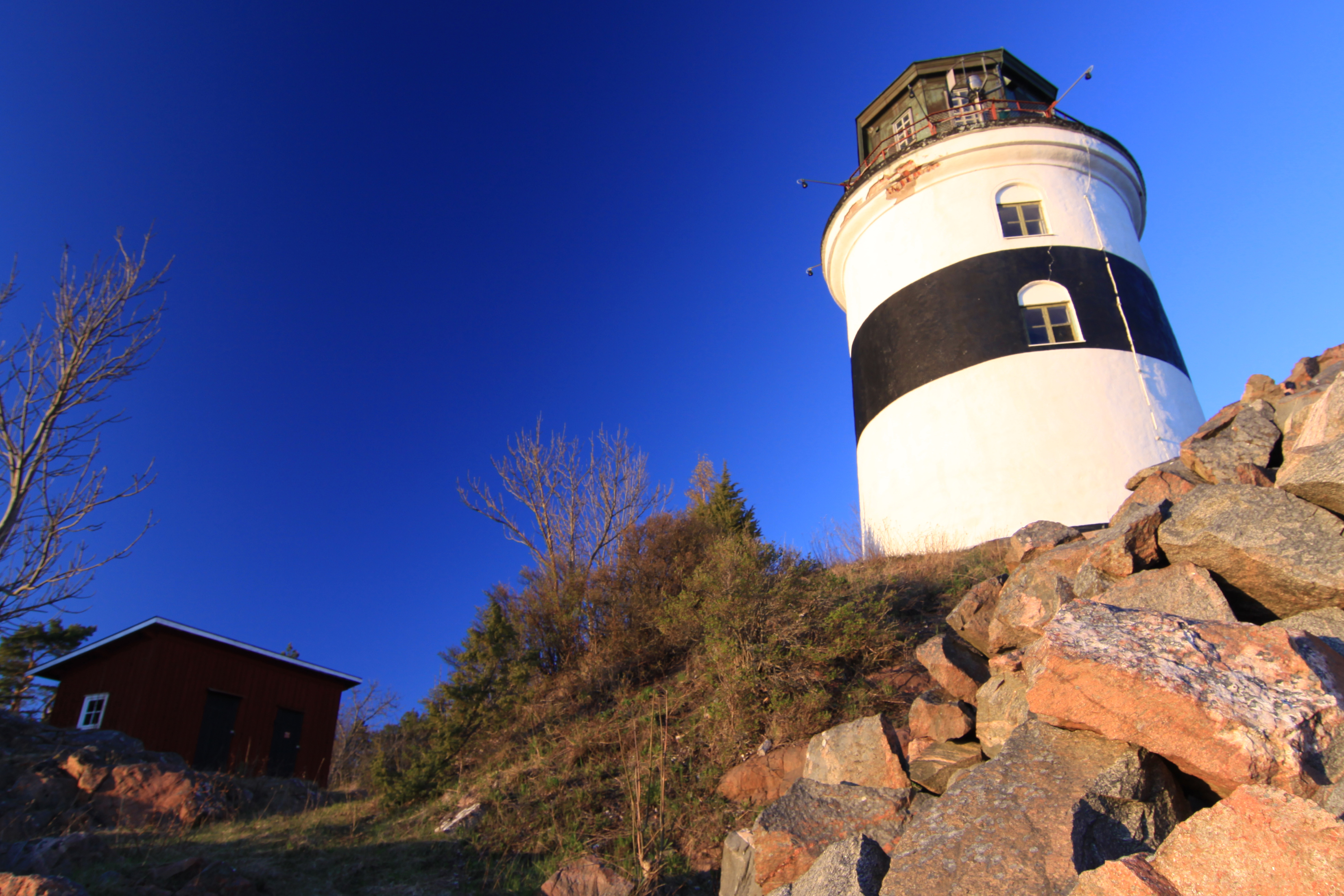
Djursten lighthouse at Västerbyn on the west side of Gräsö

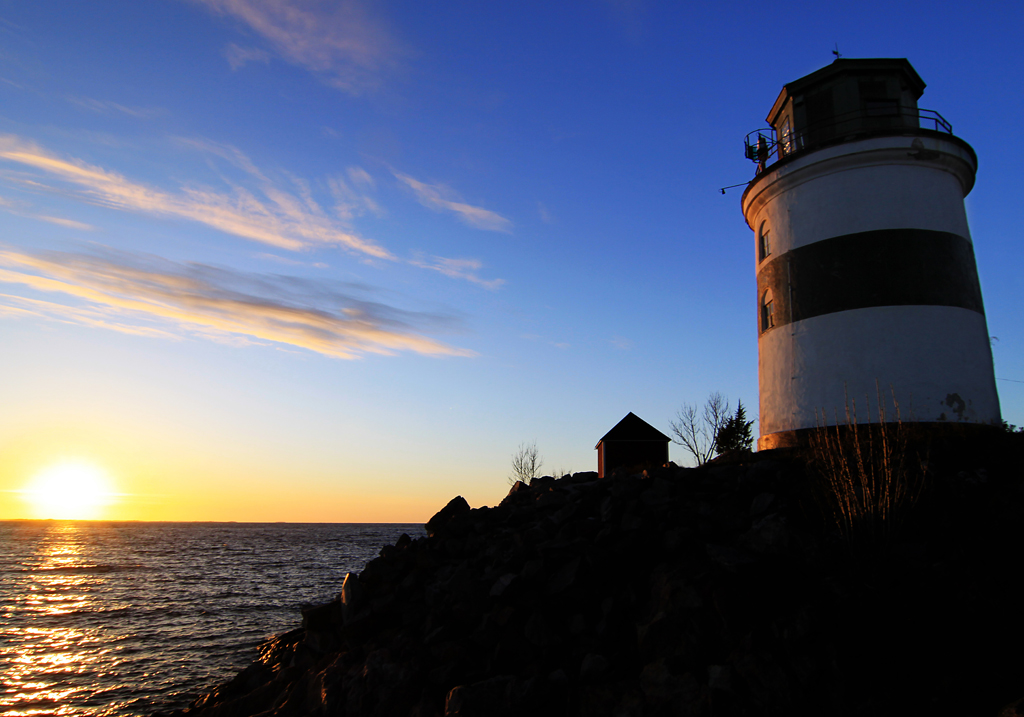
Another view of the lighthouse

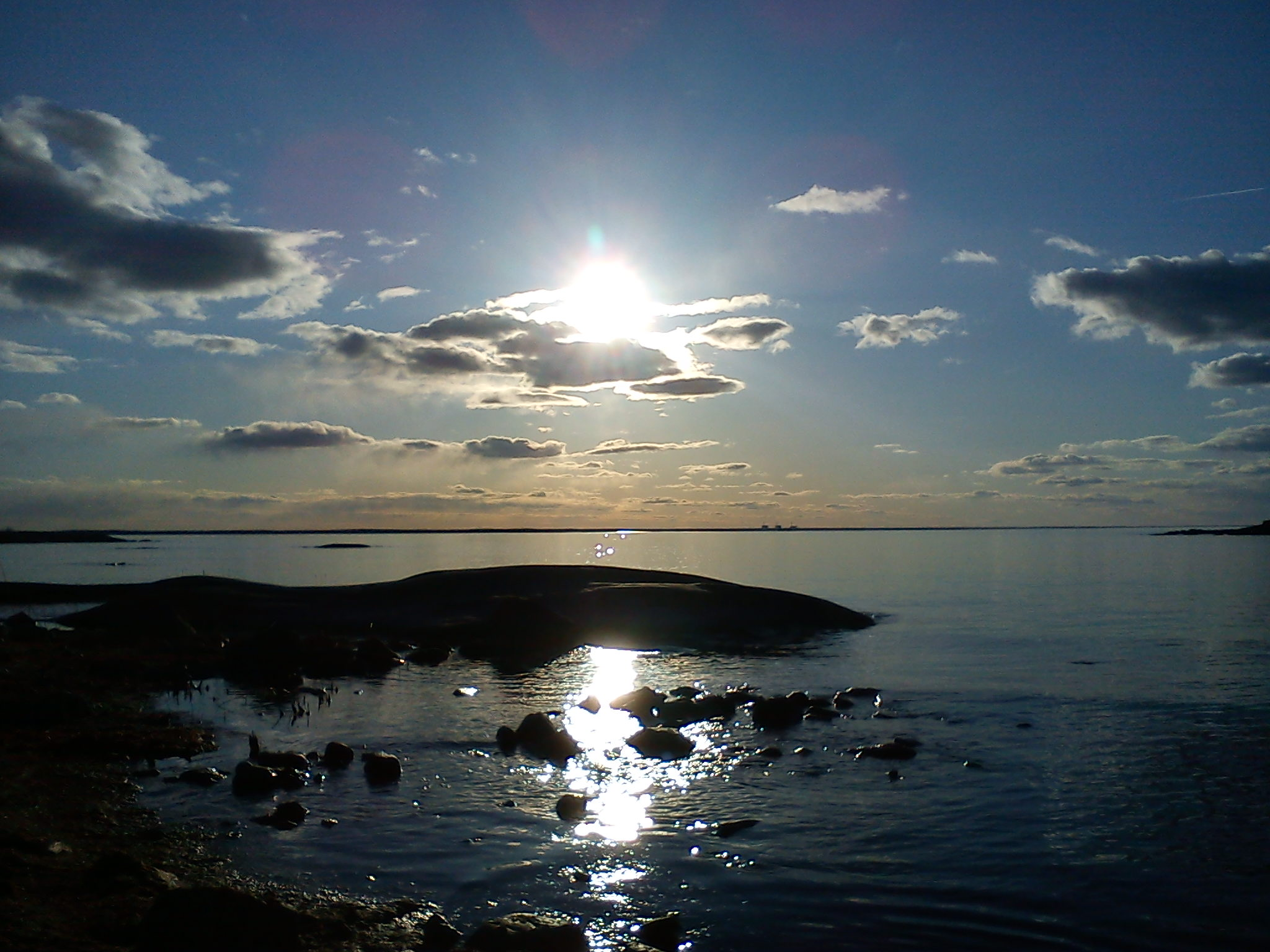
West side of the island in evening (4 April 2012, 18:06:26)
