= SM UB-27 =

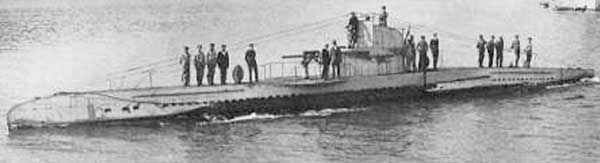
- SM UB-45, a U-boat similar to UB-27

History

German Empire
- Name: UB-27
- Ordered: 30 April 1915
- Builder: AG Weser, Bremen
- Cost: 1,291,000 German Papiermark
- Yard number: 241
- Laid down: 8 July 1915
- Launched: 10 February 1916
- Commissioned: 23 February 1916
- Fate: Sunk on 29 July 1917

General characteristics
- Class & type: Type UB II submarine
- Displacement: 265 t (261 long tons) surfaced; 291 t (286 long tons) submerged
- Length: 36.13 m (118 ft 6 in) o/a; 27.13 m (89 ft) pressure hull
- Beam: 4.36 m (14 ft 4 in) o/a; 3.85 m (13 ft) pressure hull
- Draught: 3.66 m (12 ft)
- Propulsion: 1 × propeller shaft; 2 × 6-cylinder diesel engine, 270 PS (200 kW; 270 bhp); 2 × electric motor, 280 PS (210 kW; 280 shp)
- Speed: 8.9 knots (16.5 km/h; 10.2 mph) surfaced; 5.72 knots (10.59 km/h; 6.58 mph) submerged
- Range: 7,200 nmi (13,300 km; 8,300 mi) at 5 knots (9.3 km/h; 5.8 mph) surfaced; 45 nmi (83 km; 52 mi) at 4 knots (7.4 km/h; 4.6 mph) submerged
- Test depth: 50 m (160 ft)
- Complement: 2 officers, 21 men
- Armament: 2 × 50 cm (19.7 in) torpedo tubes; 4 × torpedoes (later 6); 1 × 5 cm SK L/40 gun
- Notes: 30-second diving time

Service record
- Part of: I Flotilla; 14 April 1916 - 1 February 1917; II Flotilla; 1 February - 21 April 1917; Baltic Flotilla; 21 April - 19 July 1917; Flandern Flotilla; 19 – 29 July 1917
- Commanders: Kptlt. Victor Dieckmann; 23 February – 31 October 1916; Oblt.z.S. Hans Georg Lübbe; 1 November 1916 – 23 April 1917; Oblt.z.S. Freiherr Heinz von Stein zu Lausnitz; 24 April – 29 July 1917
- Operations: 17 patrols
- Victories: 10 merchant ships sunk (16,094 GRT); 1 auxiliary warship sunk (1,997 GRT); 3 merchant ships damaged (3,240 GRT); 1 merchant ship taken as prize (1,019 GRT)

SM UB-27 was a German Type UB II submarine or U-boat in the German Imperial Navy (German: Kaiserliche Marine) during World War I. The U-boat was ordered on 30 April 1915 and launched on 10 February 1916. She was commissioned into the German Imperial Navy on 23 February 1916 as SM UB-27. (Note: "SM" stands for "Seiner Majestät" (English: His Majesty's) and combined with the U for Unterseeboot would be translated as His Majesty's Submarine.) UB-27 sank 11 ships in 17 patrols for a total of 18,091 gross register tons (GRT).

== Design ==
A Type UB II submarine, UB-27 had a displacement of 265 tonnes (261 long tons) when at the surface and 291 tonnes (286 long tons) while submerged. She had a total length of 36.13 m (118 ft 6 in), a beam of 4.36 m (14 ft 4 in), and a draught of 3.66 m (12 ft 0 in). The submarine was powered by two Benz six-cylinder diesel engines producing a total 270 metric horsepower (270 shp; 200 kW), two Siemens-Schuckert electric motors producing 280 metric horsepower (210 kW; 280 shp), and one propeller shaft. She was capable of operating at depths of up to 50 metres (160 ft).

The submarine had a maximum surface speed of 8.90 knots (16.48 km/h; 10.24 mph) and a maximum submerged speed of 5.72 knots (10.59 km/h; 6.58 mph). When submerged, she could operate for 45 nautical miles (83 km; 52 mi) at 4 knots (7.4 km/h; 4.6 mph); when surfaced, she could travel 7,200 nautical miles (13,300 km; 8,300 mi) at 5 knots (9.3 km/h; 5.8 mph). UB-26 was fitted with two 50 centimetres (20 in) torpedo tubes, four torpedoes, and one 5 cm (2.0 in) SK L/40 deck gun. She had a complement of twenty-one crew members and two officers and a thirty-second dive time.

== Service history ==
On 29 April 1916 in the North Sea about 15 nautical miles (28 km; 17 mi) south-east of Souter Point near Whitburn, County Durham, UB-27 opened with her deck gun fire at SS Wandle, an 889 GRT "flat-iron" collier of the Wandsworth, Wimbledon and Epsom District Gas Company. The collier engaged the submarine and survived. Afterwards in Britain it was believed Wandle had sunk UB-27 and the master, G.E.A. Mastin, and his crew were celebrated.

UB-27 disappeared after 22 July 1917. HMS Halcyon reported ramming and depth charging a U-boat on 29 July 1917. A postwar German study concluded that it was possible that Halcyon sank UB-27 at 52°47′N 2°24′E.

== Summary of raiding history ==
Date	Name	Nationality	Tonnage (Note: Merchant ship tonnages are in gross register tons. Military vessels are listed by tons displacement.)	Fate
28 April 1916	Blessing	United Kingdom	19	Sunk
28 April 1916	Christian	Denmark	227	Damaged
29 April 1916	Teal	United Kingdom	766	Sunk
29 April 1916	Wandle	United Kingdom	889	Damaged
30 April 1916	Mod	Norway	664	Sunk
1 May 1916	Rio Branco	Brazil	2,258	Sunk
2 May 1916	Mars	Norway	581	Sunk
2 May 1916	Memento	Norway	654	Sunk
2 May 1916	Superb	Norway	770	Sunk
24 August 1916	HMS Duke of Albany	Royal Navy	1,997	Sunk
27 August 1916	Skjaereg	Norway	1,019	Captured as prize
7 October 1916	Jupiter	United Kingdom	2,124	Damaged
8 October 1916	Magnus	United Kingdom	154	Sunk
12 March 1917	Thode Fagelund	Norway	4,352	Sunk
14 March 1917	Davanger	Norway	5,876	Sunk

== Bibliography ==
- Bendert, Harald (2000). Die UB-Boote der Kaiserlichen Marine, 1914-1918. Einsätze, Erfolge, Schicksal (in German). Hamburg: Verlag E.S. Mittler & Sohn GmbH. ISBN 3-8132-0713-7.
- Gröner, Erich; Jung, Dieter; Maass, Martin (1991). U-boats and Mine Warfare Vessels. German Warships 1815–1945. Vol. 2. Translated by Thomas, Keith; Magowan, Rachel. London: Conway Maritime Press. ISBN 0-85177-593-4.
- Rössler, Eberhard (1979). Die deutschen U-Boote und ihre Werften: eine Bilddokumentation über den deutschen U-Bootbau; in zwei Bänden (in German). Vol. I. Munich: Bernard & Graefe. ISBN 3-7637-5213-7.
