= Fälö by =

Coordinates: 60°13′N 18°38′E

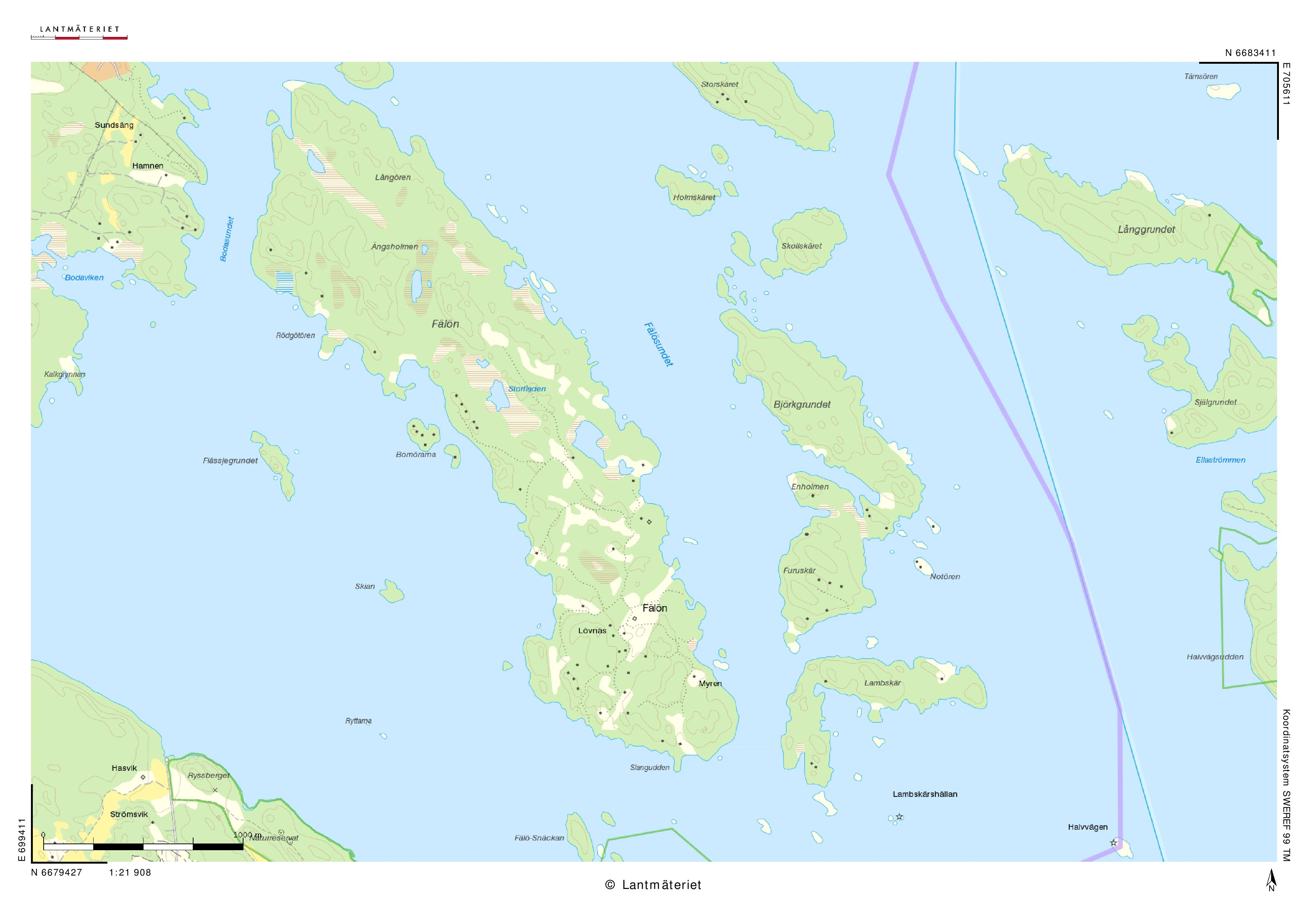

Fälö by is a village in northern Roslagen, Börstil parish, Väddö and Häverö skeppslag, Östhammar, Uppsala County, Sweden. By (village) is a historical entity that was providing a soldier each.

The village lies east of Raggarön, north of Slatön, south of Ormön/Vässarö and west of Singö.

== Historical development ==
Fälö by was populated by farmers in the 17th century by farmers from Singö. In surveying records are maps and documents on storskifte in 1799 and llaga skifte in 1875. In the second half of the 19th century there were about five small farms and a similar number of smaller households (i.e. cottage, etc.). The name is historically unchanged since at least the 18th century. It now houses about 50 properties, where most are used as summer houses. The village now has about 10 permanent residents.

== Fälön ==
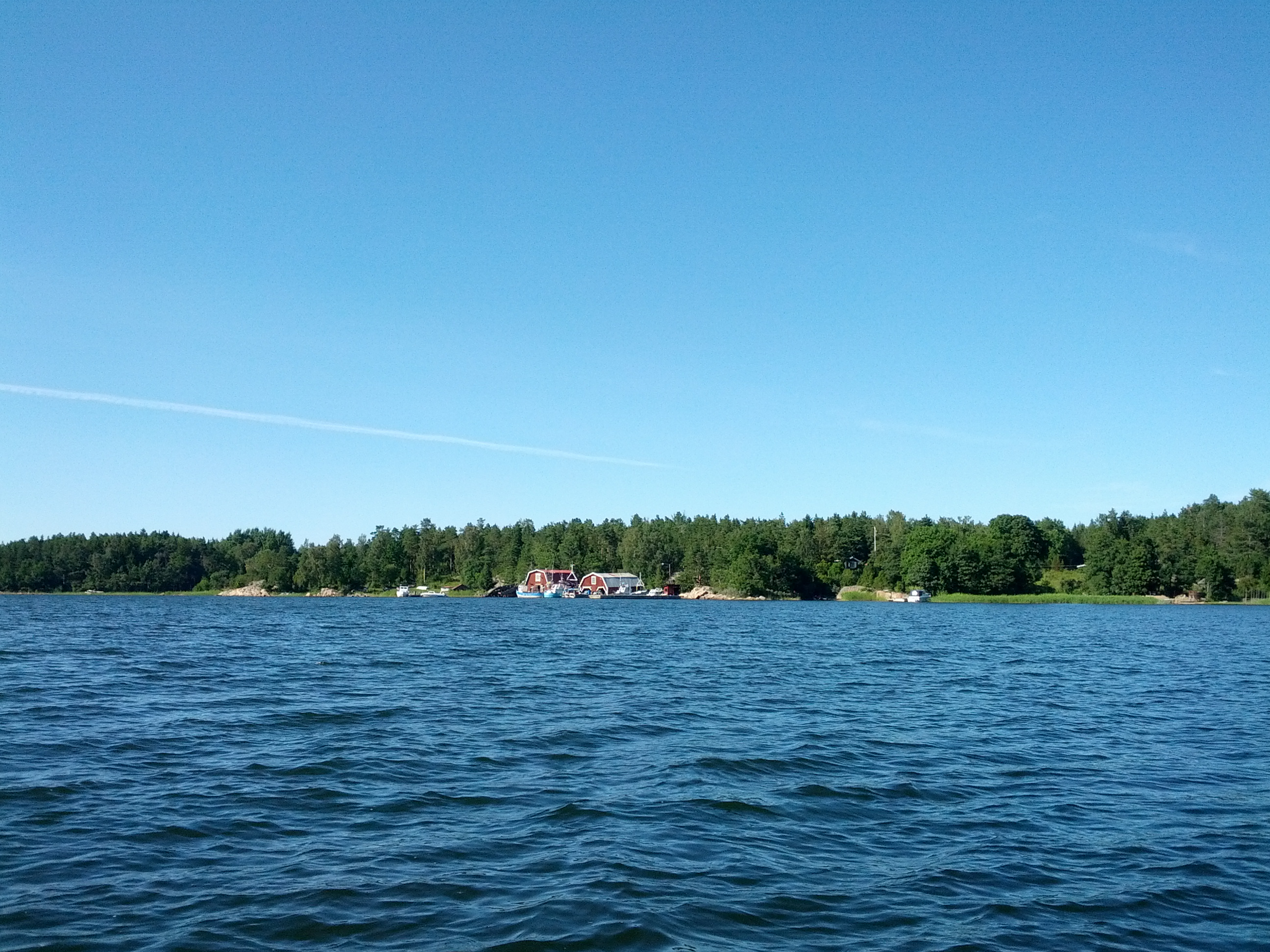
Fälön from the southwest

The island of Fälön is barely 2 km ², it consists of several islands which have risen up because of land elevation. The southern part constitutes "real" Fälön; the midsection, Kungens skär and Måsören; the north, Ängsholmen and Långören. Ängsholmen and Långören do not belong to Fälön.

On the island there are about five permanent households and about 25 summer houses. There is commercial fishing, and some farming on a smaller scale.

=== Etymology ===
Source unknown. The name Fälö is documented with unchanged spelling at least as early as the 17th century. There is a possible common root with the south Swedish word Fälad, referring to either croplands, or on the ground.

=== Gloe lakes ===
- Storfladen: Until the 18th century, this was a bay at Kungens skär. However, it is no longer connected to the sea. Approximately 4 acres.
- Måsörsfladen.
- Gårdsfladen: Until the 18th century this was a bay of Fälön, later a gloe lake. From the 20th century, it was more or less completely overgrown and composed of marsh.
- Mellanfladen (now divided into Norrsundsfladen and Natviksfladen).
- Långörsfladen

== Other islands and islets ==
=== Enholmen ===
The island is about 8 acres, located east of Fälösundet and the earliest populated island along with Fälön. The name of the island was at least documented since the 18th century with unchanged spelling. An old cottage from at least the 1840s is still there, and there are traces of some old buildings. In the 19th century it rose up with Furuskär.

=== Furuskär ===
The name is documented at least since the 18th century with unchanged spelling. The island is about 30 acres. Previously a temporary meadow and barn were found where the animals were shipped by boat. In the 21st century there are 6-7 summer houses on the island.

=== Björkgrundet and Tallören (Tallörn) ===
Björkgrundet is the second largest island after Fälön, 40 acres. The name is historically unchanged since at least the 18th century. Earlier, there were temporary meadows and barns where animals were shipped over. Nowadays, the island is completely uninhabited and fields more or less overgrown.

Tallören is a small island wedged between Furuskär and Björkgrundet that grew up with Björgrundet when parts of Enholmssundet dried out because of land uplift in the 19th century.

=== Lambskär ===
Located east of Fälöströmmen, south of Björkgrundet and has approximately the same area as Furuskär. In documents from the 18th century and contemporary maps the island has this spelling, but in between both lamskär and lammskär were used. There are no old buildings or meadow, relatively mountainous terrain, and now three cottages on the island.

=== Notören ===
Small island (about 2 acres). The island has a cottage (more recent than Enholmen) which is now used as summer house. Next to the island there is an even smaller island without an official name with a summerhouse.

=== Bomörarna (Bomörarne) ===
Two small islands (about 2 + 1 acres) located only about 50 yards west of Fälön. The name has existed since at least the 19th century. No old buildings there, now five summer houses.

=== Other islands ===
Skian, Fälösnäckan and Snäckan are smaller named islets without settlements. There are also a few minor cuts. There Fälö Village adjacent to the Singö (and also the county of Stockholm in the middle of Singö fjärden) is the small island of Halvvägen (Half Way)) with its lighthouse. Ängsholmen and Långören belongs to Mälby, but have risen up with Fälön. On Ängsholmen there are four homes while Långören is completely uninhabited.

== Nature and Fisheries ==
The area is considerably less-developed and influenced by humans than the more southern parts of Roslagen and Stockholm archipelago, and is bordered to the south by the Slaton-Medholma nature reserves. The islands are largely covered with mixed forest and some grassland. Elk, deer, eagles, lynx and wild boar are examples of large animals that have been present on the islands in recent years.

== Communication ==
From Uppsala and Östhammar, the nearest access by car is to Raggarön and from there about 10 minutes by boat.
