= Örskär =

Nature reserve in Uppsala, Sweden

Örskär lighthouse Örskär
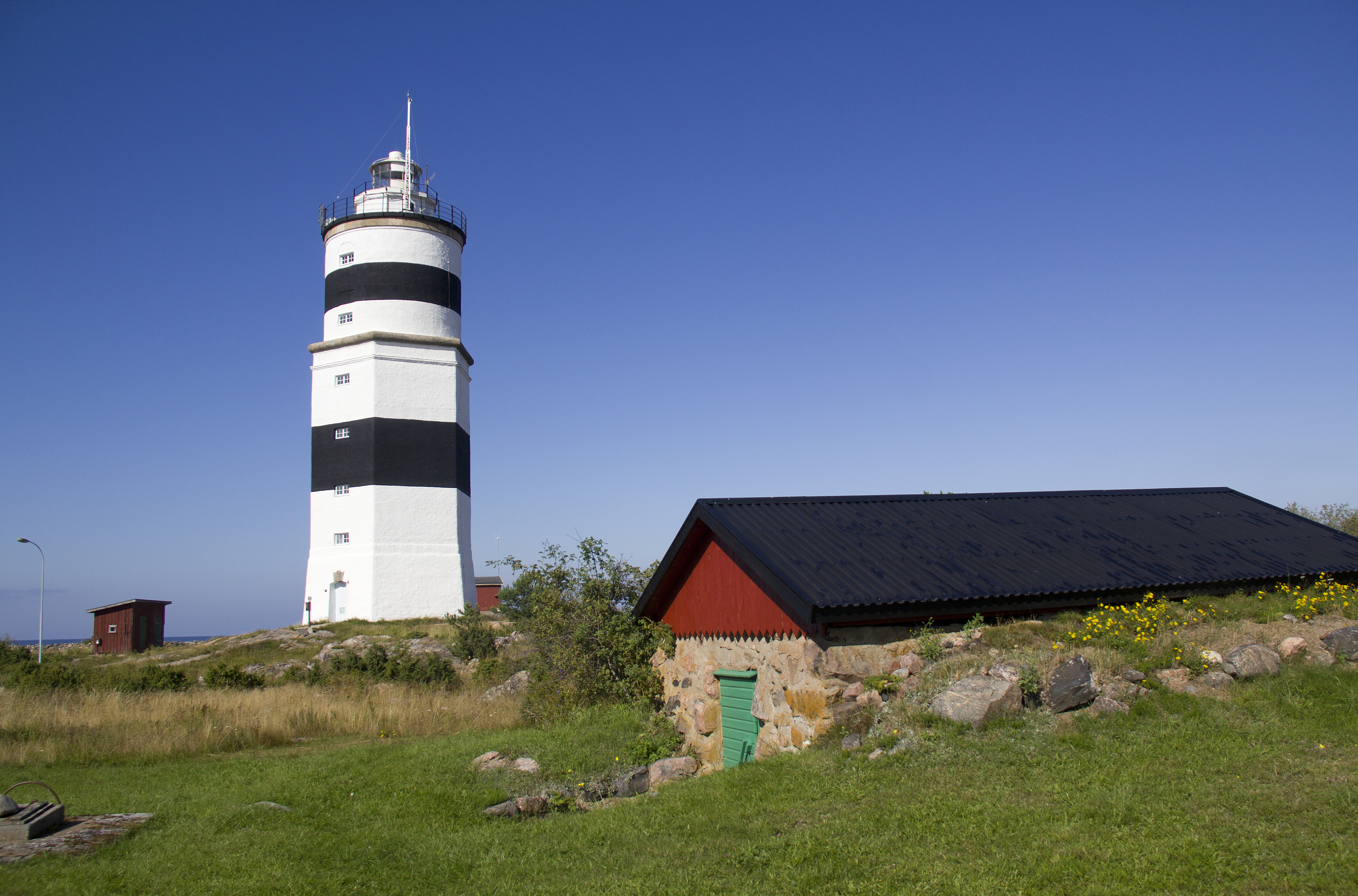
- Örskär Lighthouse
- Location: Örskär, north of Gräsö; Östhammar; Sweden
- Coordinates: 60.526368°N 18.373346°E

Tower
- Constructed: 1687 (first)
- Foundation: stone
- Construction: stone tower
- Automated: 1978
- Height: 32 metres (105 ft)
- Shape: massive two-stage tower: octagonal prism lower section, cylindrical upper section with balcony and lantern
- Markings: white tower with a black band on each stage
- Power source: rapeseed oil, kerosene, acetylene, electricity
- Operator: Swedish Maritime Administration (Sjöfartsverket)
- Heritage: governmental listed building complex, governmental listed building

Light
- First lit: 1740 (current)
- Focal height: 36.5 metres (120 ft)
- Lens: mirrors (original), 4th order fresnel lens (current)
- Range: 16 nautical miles (30 km; 18 mi)
- Characteristic: Fl (2) W 10s.
- Sweden no.: SV-2125

Örskär, is a Swedish island and lighthouse station located north of Gräsö on the Uppland coastline. A large part of the island is a nature reserve and it is rich of unusual flowers such as wild orchids. The island is also noted to be a good place for birding. A very small hostel exists on the island.

== History ==
Örskär was one of the first lightstations to be built in Sweden. The first lighthouse was constructed of wood in 1684, but was burned down in 1738 when it was hit by the lightning. The present tower was constructed by the royal architect Carl Hårleman. The flame in the lantern ran on colza oil lamps, and mirrors collected the light. Kerosene lamps replaced the colza oil lamps in the 1870s. It was finally electrified in 1954. Today the lighthouse is owned and remote-controlled by the Swedish Maritime Administration.

== Climate ==
Örskär has a humid continental climate (Dfb) with maritime influence. Its exterior position from the Swedish mainland renders in smaller seasonal variations than nearby locations. Although it is a maritime microclimate, it is more prone to extremes in temperatures than other outlying weather stations.

Climate data for Örskär (2002–2015; precipitation 1961–1990; extremes since 1937)
Month	Jan	Feb	Mar	Apr	May	Jun	Jul	Aug	Sep	Oct	Nov	Dec	Year
Record high °C (°F)	9.1 (48.4)	10.5 (50.9)	15.9 (60.6)	22.0 (71.6)	28.0 (82.4)	34.5 (94.1)	32.5 (90.5)	30.6 (87.1)	26.0 (78.8)	20.2 (68.4)	12.1 (53.8)	10.5 (50.9)	34.5 (94.1)
Mean daily maximum °C (°F)	0.4 (32.7)	0.0 (32.0)	2.9 (37.2)	8.0 (46.4)	12.7 (54.9)	17.1 (62.8)	20.9 (69.6)	20.2 (68.4)	15.8 (60.4)	9.6 (49.3)	5.4 (41.7)	2.4 (36.3)	9.6 (49.3)
Daily mean °C (°F)	−1.3 (29.7)	−1.8 (28.8)	0.4 (32.7)	4.7 (40.5)	9.4 (48.9)	13.9 (57.0)	17.8 (64.0)	17.3 (63.1)	13.3 (55.9)	7.6 (45.7)	3.8 (38.8)	0.7 (33.3)	7.1 (44.8)
Mean daily minimum °C (°F)	−3.1 (26.4)	−3.6 (25.5)	−2.1 (28.2)	1.5 (34.7)	6.1 (43.0)	10.6 (51.1)	14.7 (58.5)	14.5 (58.1)	10.7 (51.3)	5.7 (42.3)	2.1 (35.8)	−1.0 (30.2)	4.6 (40.3)
Record low °C (°F)	−26.0 (−14.8)	−28.9 (−20.0)	−22.1 (−7.8)	−15.8 (3.6)	−5.2 (22.6)	2.4 (36.3)	7.1 (44.8)	5.5 (41.9)	−0.4 (31.3)	−3.4 (25.9)	−10.5 (13.1)	−17.3 (0.9)	−28.9 (−20.0)
Average precipitation mm (inches)	30.5 (1.20)	22.8 (0.90)	22.2 (0.87)	25.5 (1.00)	26.0 (1.02)	30.5 (1.20)	44.6 (1.76)	60.3 (2.37)	48.6 (1.91)	39.5 (1.56)	46.8 (1.84)	34.9 (1.37)	432.0 (17.01)
Source 1: SMHI
Source 2: SMHI Monthly Data 2002–2015

== See also ==
- List of lighthouses and lightvessels in Sweden
