= SS Taormina =

SS Taormina may refer to the following ships:

- SS Taormina (1884), an ocean liner with a 2,422 gross register tons (GRT) built by Alexander Stephen & Sons for R Sloman & Co's Hamburg-Antwerp-Australia route. (1884–1911), Luigi Pittaluga (1911–1917); sunk 60 nautical miles (110 km) from Cornwall by SM UC-16 on 18 January 1917
- SS Taormina (1897), a steamship of 1,384 GRT built for Jörgen C. Knudser of Norway; fate unknown
- SS Taormina (1908), an ocean liner of 8,282 GRT that sailed for the Italia Line (1908–1912), Lloyd Italiano (1912–1918), and Navigazione Generale Italiana (1918–1929); chartered by the United States in World War I for one troopship voyage; scrapped in Italy in 1929
