= Djursten =

Djursten lighthouse Djursten
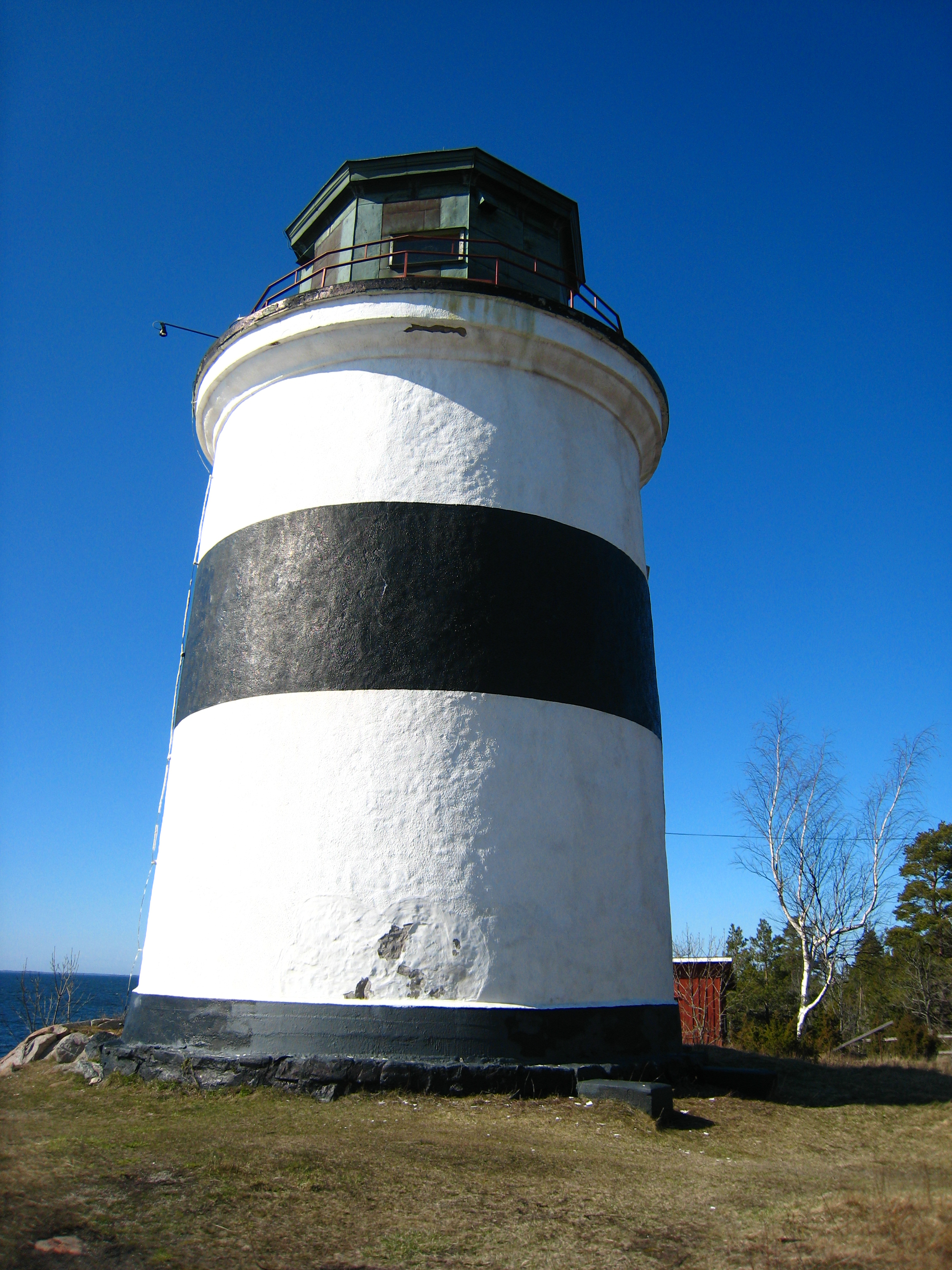
- Djursten Lighthouse, August 2006
- Location: Gräsö; Östhammar Municipality; Uppsala County; Sweden
- Coordinates: 60.368994°N 18.401187°E

Tower
- Constructed: 1767 (first)
- Construction: stone tower
- Automated: 1962
- Height: 15 metres (49 ft)
- Shape: massive cylinder tower with octagonal prism observation room, balcony and lantern
- Markings: white tower with black horizontal band
- Power source: rapeseed oil, kerosene, electricity, mains electricity
- Operator: Swedish Maritime Administration
- Heritage: governmental listed building complex, governmental listed building

Light
- First lit: 1839 (current)
- Focal height: 20 metres (66 ft)
- Lens: 6th order molded drum lens of acrylic glass
- Range: 11 nautical miles (20 km; 13 mi)
- Characteristic: LFl WRG 9s.
- Sweden no.: SV-2152

Djursten is a Swedish lighthouse located at Västerbyn on the west side of the island of Gräsö in the northern Roslagens archipelago. The nearest community is Öregrund.

== History ==
The location has had a lighthouse since 1767. The first lighthouse built to guide sailors from Öregrund was a stone tower topped by a charcoal fire in an iron pot. In 1809 the ship Bellona ran aground outside Djursten.

The lighthouse was replaced by a new tower built in 1839, which still stands on the site. The current lighthouse was at first equipped with an oil lamp and parabolic mirrors that focused the light. In the 1870s a kerosene lamp was installed. The lighthouse became a state monument in 1935. In 1945 the lighthouse was finally electrified. It was occupied until the 1960s.

== Status ==
Today Djursten holds a small modern light visible for 11 nautical miles mounted outside the original lighthouse lantern.

== Gallery ==
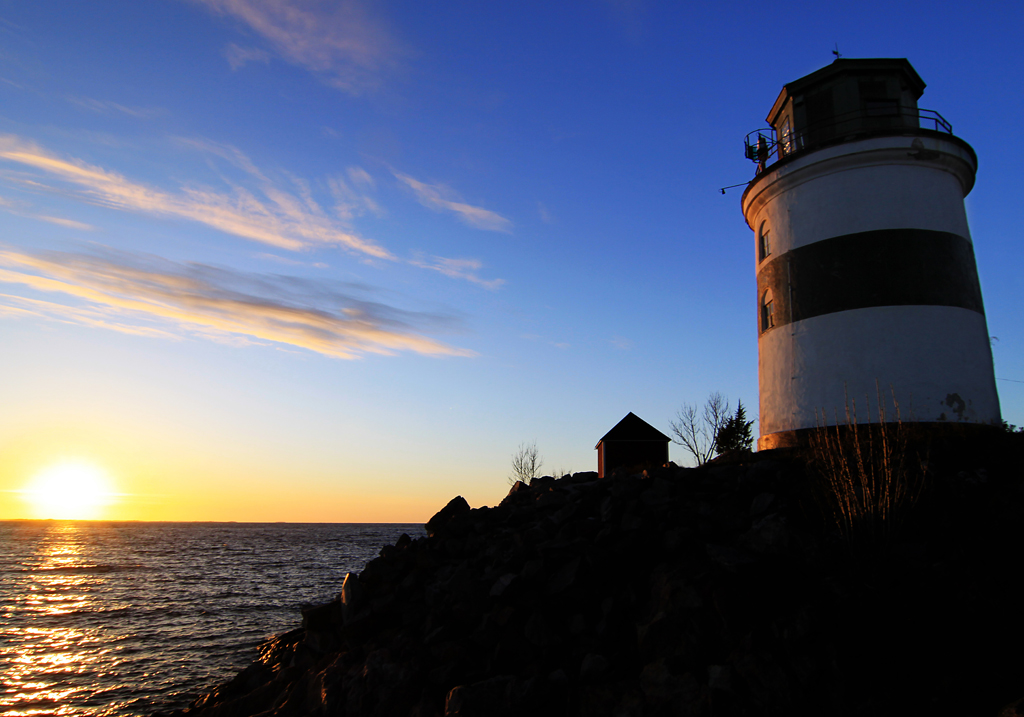
Lighthouse from the south

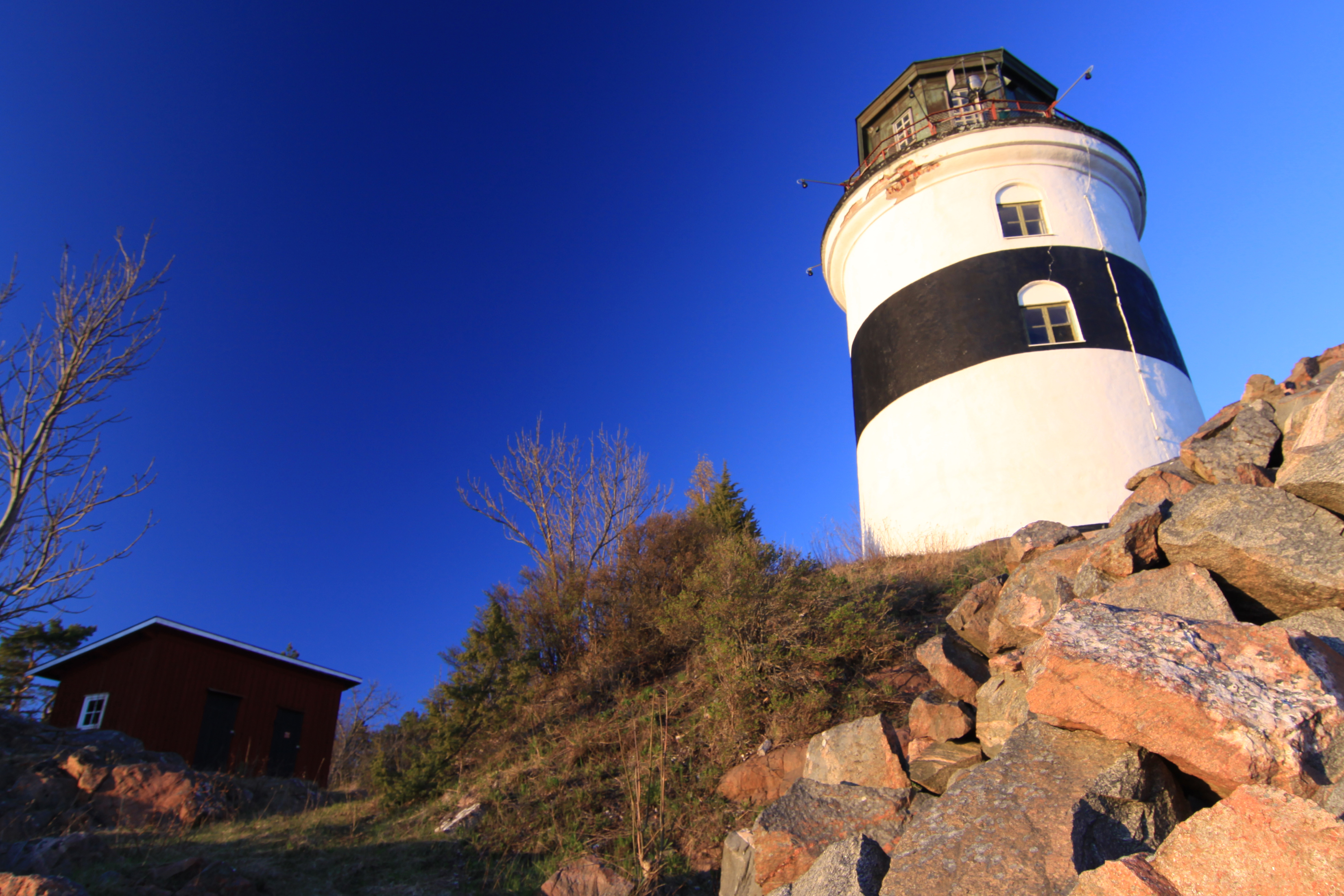
Lighthouse from the north

== See also ==
- List of lighthouses and lightvessels in Sweden
