= Som-class submarine =

Imperial Russian Navy submarine class

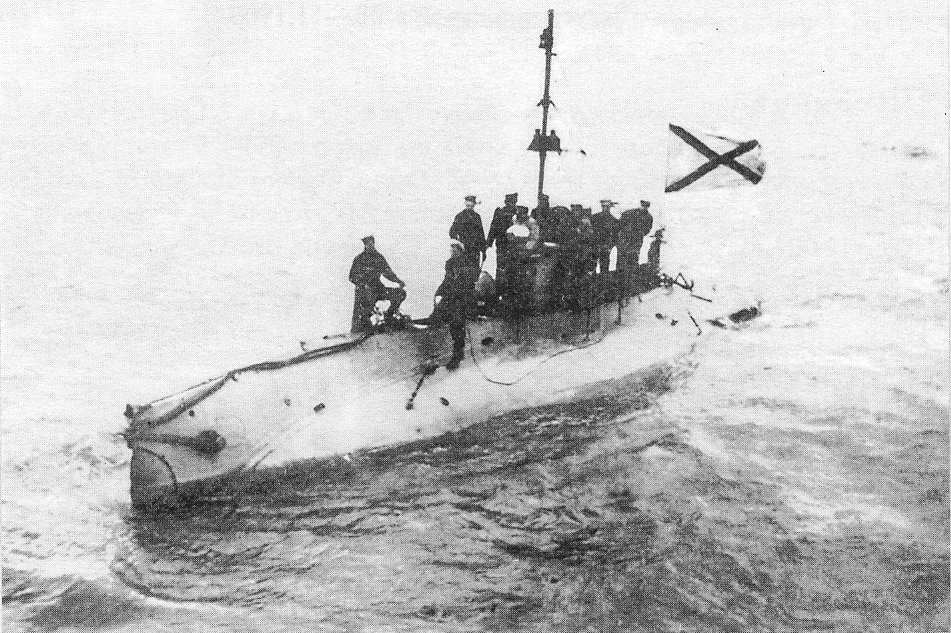
- Russian submarine Beluga

Class overview
- Name: Som class
- Builders: Nevski Yard, St. Petersburg
- Operators: Imperial Russian Navy
- In commission: 1905–1913
- Completed: 7
- Lost: 7

General characteristics
- Type: Midget submarine
- Displacement: 105 tons surfaced; 122 tons submerged
- Length: 20 m (66 ft)
- Beam: 3.5 m (11 ft)
- Draught: 2.9 m (9 ft 6 in)
- Propulsion: 1 shaft: petrol engine/electric motor; 160 hp (120 kW)/70 hp (52 kW)
- Speed: 8.5 knots (15.7 km/h; 9.8 mph) surfaced; 6 knots (11 km/h; 6.9 mph) submerged
- Complement: 24
- Armament: 1× 15-inch (381 mm) torpedo tube (bow); 1× machine gun

The Som class (Russian: Сом, lit. 'catfish') were a series of submarines built for the Imperial Russian Navy in 1904–1907. They were designed by the Electric Boat Company and ordered in the 1904 emergency programme at the time of the Russo-Japanese War. The boats were built in St. Petersburg and were designed to be transportable by train. The first boat, Som, was originally Fulton, an experimental submarine that was the prototype for USS Plunger and subsequent Plunger-class submarines. The vessel was sold and delivered to Russia in sections and re-assembled in St. Petersburg.

== Ships ==
Ship	namesake	Launched	Service / Fate
Som – Сом	Catfish	1904	ex Fulton – Delivered to Vladivostok 1904; to Black Sea Fleet then to Baltic Fleet 1915; sunk in collision 10 May 1916. The wreck was found in 2015 in Swedish territorial waters.
Beluga – Белуга	Beluga	1905	Baltic Fleet – Scuttled 25 February 1918 in Tallinn
Losos – Лосось	Salmon	1905	Black Sea Fleet – Scuttled 1919 in Sevastopol
Peskar – Пескарь	Gudgeon	1905	Baltic Fleet – Scuttled 25 February 1918 in Tallinn
Schuka – Щука	Pike	April 1905	Baltic Fleet – Scuttled 25 February 1918 in Tallinn
Sterlyad – Стерлядь	Sterlet	1905	Baltic Fleet – Scuttled 25 February 1918 in Tallinn
Sudak – Судак	Sander	1907	Black Sea Fleet – Scuttled 1919 in Sevastopol

== Wreck found ==
In July 2015 it was reported that the wreck of Som (Сом) had been located in Swedish waters.

== Bibliography ==
- Budzbon, Przemysław (1985). "Russia". In Gray, Randal (ed.). Conway's All the World's Fighting Ships 1906–1921. Naval Institute Press. ISBN 0-85177-245-5.
- Harris, Mark (2025). The First World War in the Baltic Sea. Vol. 1: Essen's Triumph, 1914 to February 1915. Helion. ISBN 978-1-804519-10-3.
- Polmar, Norman & Noot, Jurrien (1991). Submarines of the Russian and Soviet Navies, 1718–1990. Naval Institute Press. ISBN 0-87021-570-1.
