= Svartklubben =

Lighthouse in Norrtälje Municipality, Baltic coast, Sweden

Svartklubben lighthouse Svartklubben
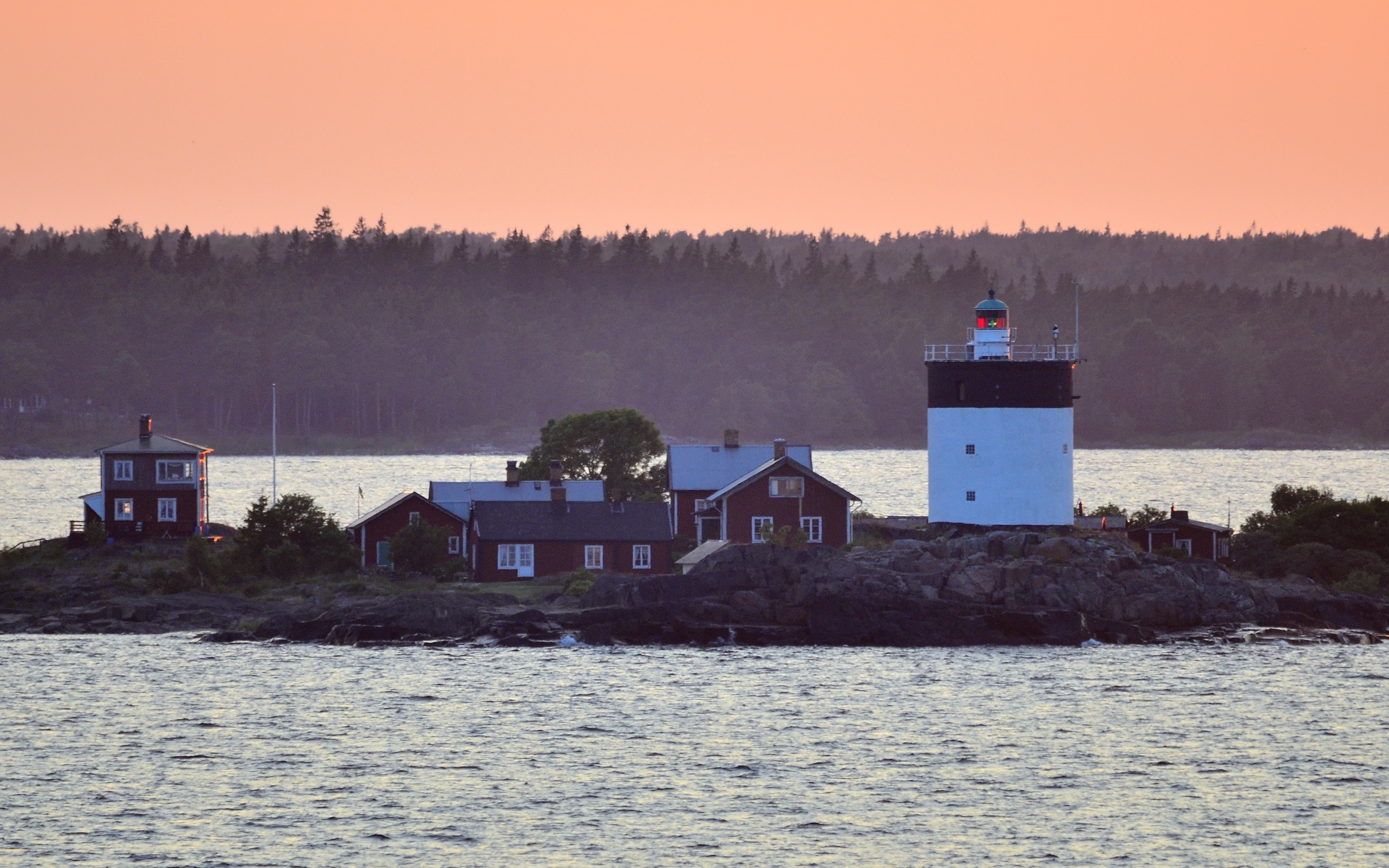
- Location: East of Singö; Åland Sea; Sweden
- Coordinates: 60.174413°N 18.824993°E

Tower
- Constructed: 1820
- Construction: stone tower
- Automated: 1961
- Height: 12 metres (39 ft)
- Shape: massive cylindrical tower with gallery and lantern
- Markings: white tower with a black band on the top
- Power source: bituminous coal, rapeseed oil, kerosene, electricity
- Operator: Swedish Maritime Administration (Sjöfartsverket)
- Heritage: governmental listed building complex, governmental listed building
- Racon: K

Light
- First lit: 1920
- Focal height: 19.5 metres (64 ft)
- Lens: open fire (original), 4th order Fresnel lens (1899)
- Range: 16 nautical miles (30 km; 18 mi)
- Characteristic: LFl (2) WRG 15s.
- Sweden no.: SV-2228

Svartklubben is a Swedish lighthouse located on a small island east of the island Singö in the province of Uppland.

This massive lighthouse was constructed to carry a coal fire. In 1842 it was updated with a colza oil lamp and in 1849 parabolic mirrors were installed. In 1875 it was updated with a kerosene lamp, and in 1899 the current lens and lantern were installed. It got a gas mantle light in 1935, and was finally electrified and automated in 1961. The keeper's house is now sold as a private residence, but the Swedish Maritime Administration still owns and maintains the lighthouse.

The lighthouse has been a listed building in Sweden since 1935.

== See also ==
- List of lighthouses and lightvessels in Sweden
