= Singö =

Island in Stockholm County, Sweden

Coordinates: 60°10′N 18°45′E

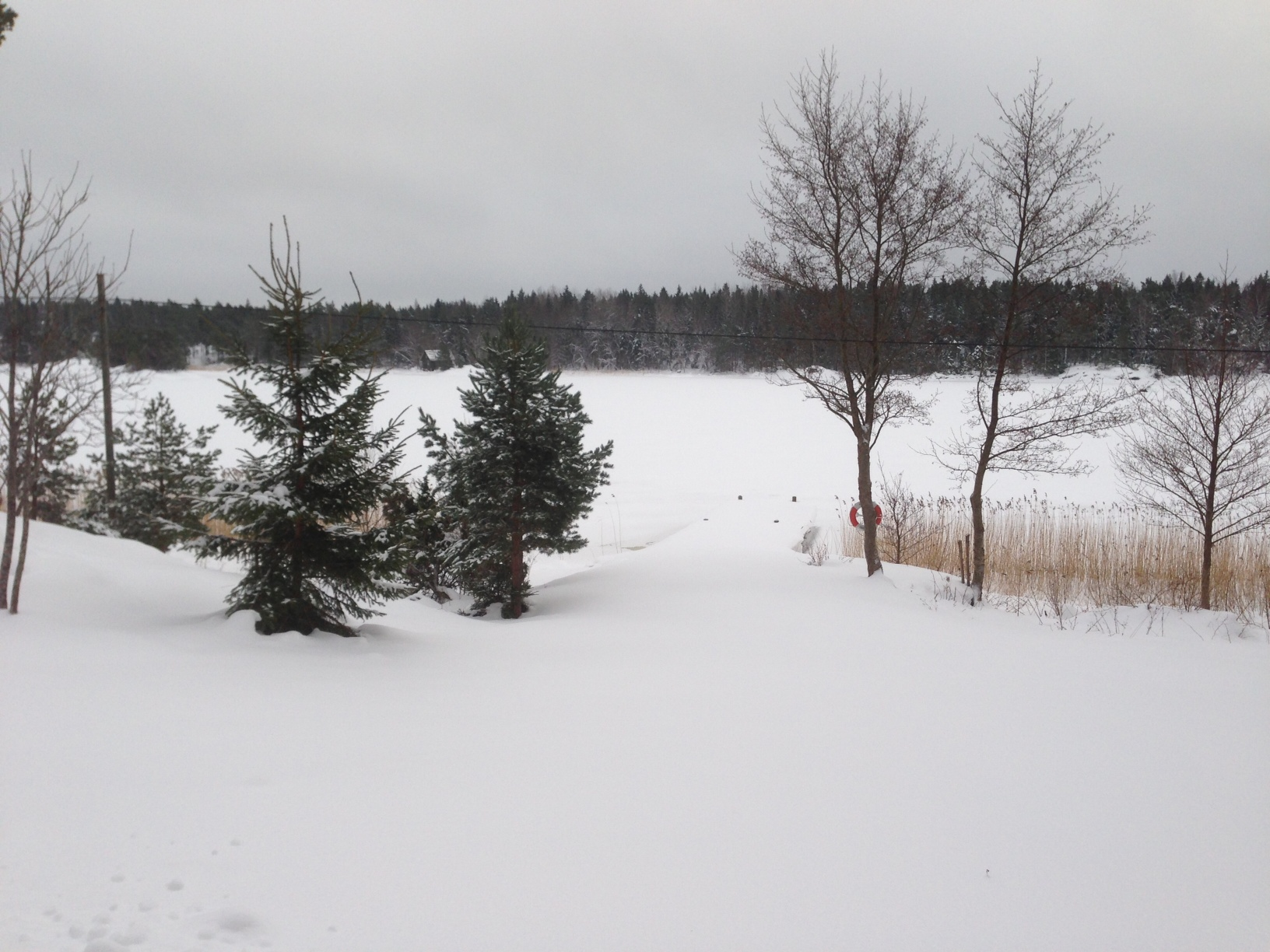
Dalviken, Ellan in December 2012.

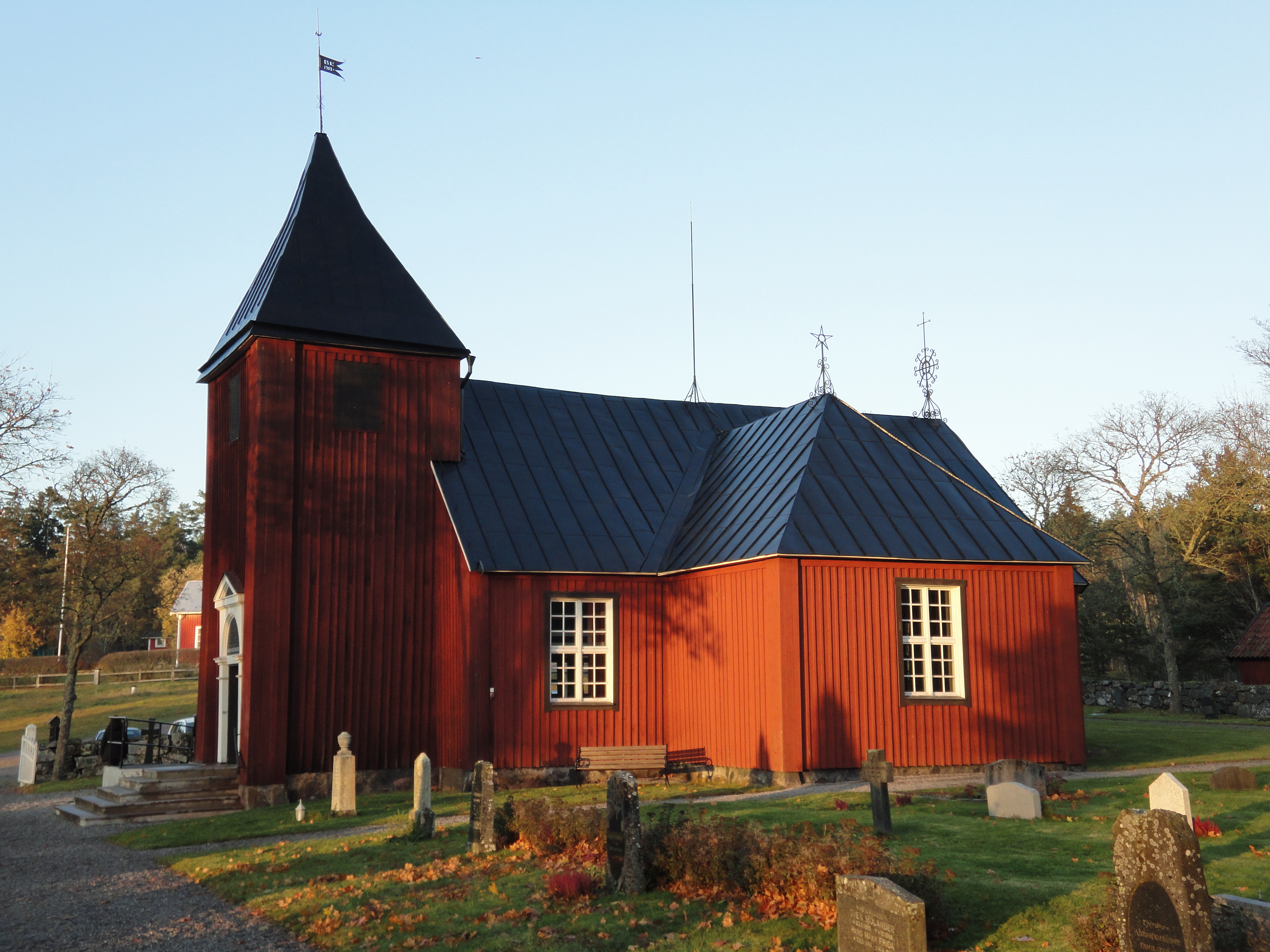
Singö's Church.

Singö Is an island located in the north of Stockholm County, close to the border of Uppsala County. The island has around 400 inhabitants and is around 25 km² big, making it the 36th largest island in Sweden by size.

Söderby, Backby, Tranvik, Ellan, Norrvreta and Boda are the villages located on Singö, the closest village with over 200 inhabitants is however Grisslehamn on Väddö. In Söderby, there is a small grocery store.
