= List of shipwrecks in August 1914 =

The list of shipwrecks in August 1914 includes ships sunk, foundered, grounded, or otherwise lost during August 1914.

== 3 August ==
List of shipwrecks: 3 August 1914
Ship	State	Description
George H. Van Vleck	United States	The steamer burned at Duluth, Minnesota. Raised, repaired and returned to service.
SMS S143	Imperial German Navy	The S138-class torpedo boat suffered a boiler explosion and sank in the Baltic Sea. Raised, repaired, and returned to service.
San Wilfrido	United Kingdom	World War I: The tanker (6,458 GRT, 1914) struck a mine at Cuxhaven, Lower Saxony, Germany. Her crew were rescued but made prisoners of war.

== 5 August ==
List of shipwrecks: 5 August 1914
Ship	State	Description
SMS Königin Luise	Imperial German Navy	World War I: The auxiliary minelayer was scuttled in the Heligoland Bight following battle damaged inflicted by HMS Landrail and HMS Lance (both Royal Navy). Forty-six of her 100 crew were rescued by HMS Amphion (Royal Navy), HMS Landrail and HMS Lance.

== 6 August ==
List of shipwrecks: 6 August 1914
Ship	State	Description
HMS Amphion	Royal Navy	World War I: The Active-class cruiser struck a mine and sank in the Heligoland Bight with the loss of about 170 lives, including eighteen survivors from SMS Königin Luise (Imperial German Navy).
City of Winchester	United Kingdom	World War I: The cargo ship (6,601 GRT) was captured in the Arabian Sea 280 nautical miles (520 km) east of Aden by SMS Königsberg (Imperial German Navy). She was scuttled on 12 August.

== 7 August ==
List of shipwrecks: 7 August 1914
Ship	State	Description
Annie Schmitz	United States	The sloop sank near Fishers Island, New York. Later refloated.
Tubal Cain	United Kingdom	World War I: The trawler (227 GRT) was shelled and sunk in the Atlantic Ocean 50 nautical miles (93 km) west north west of Stalberg, Iceland, by the auxiliary cruiser Kaiser Wilhelm der Grosse (Imperial German Navy).

== 8 August ==
List of shipwrecks: 8 August 1914
Ship	State	Description
Tysla	Norway	World War I: The vessel struck a Dutch mine off Vlissingen in the North Sea with the loss of three crew.

== 9 August ==
List of shipwrecks: 9 August 1914
Ship	State	Description
SM U-15	Imperial German Navy	World War I: The Type U 13 submarine was rammed by HMS Birmingham (Royal Navy) and sunk off Fair Isle with the loss of all 23 crew.

== 12 August ==
List of shipwrecks: 12 August 1914
Ship	State	Description
SM U-13	Imperial German Navy	The Type U 13 submarine was lost in the Heligoland Bight with the loss of all 25 crew.

== 13 August ==
List of shipwrecks: 13 August 1914
Ship	State	Description
SMS Baron Gautsch	Austro-Hungarian Navy	The troopship strayed off course, entered an Austro-Hungarian minefield in the Adriatic Sea 7 nautical miles south of the Brijuni Islands, struck two mines, and sank with the loss of 147 lives. The destroyers SMS Balaton, SMS Csepel, and SMS Triglav (all Austro-Hungarian Navy) rescued 150 survivors.

== 14 August ==
List of shipwrecks: 14 August 1914
Ship	State	Description
Glenfarg	United Kingdom	The cargo ship struck a rock and sank off Shirose, Japan. Her crew were rescued by Yawata Maru (Japan).

== 15 August ==
List of shipwrecks: 15 August 1914
Ship	State	Description
Hyades	United Kingdom	World War I: The cargo ship (3,352 GRT) was shelled and sunk in the Atlantic Ocean 180 nautical miles (330 km) east of Pernambuco, Brazil by SMS Dresden (Imperial German Navy).

== 16 August ==
List of shipwrecks: 16 August 1914
Ship	State	Description
Alice Stofen	United States	The 18-gross register ton, 40.5-foot (12.3 m) schooner was wrecked on Herschel Island in the Beaufort Sea off the coast of Yukon Territory. Both people on board survived.
Ellerbeck	United Kingdom	The cargo ship ran aground on the Hats and Barrels reef, in the North Sea. Her crew were rescued.
Kaipara	United Kingdom	World War I: The cargo ship (7,392 GRT) was shelled and sunk in the Atlantic Ocean 170 nautical miles (310 km) south by west of Tenerife, Canary Islands, Spain by the auxiliary cruiser Kaiser Wilhelm der Grosse (Imperial German Navy). Her crew were taken as prisoners of war.
Nyanga	United Kingdom	World War I: The cargo ship (3,066 GRT) was shelled and sunk in the Atlantic Ocean 240 nautical miles (440 km) south of Tenerife by the auxiliary cruiser Kaiser Wilhelm der Grosse (Imperial German Navy). Her crew were taken as prisoners of war.
Santa Catharina	Germany	World War I: The cargo ship was sunk off the Brazilian coast at Abrolhos, Bahia, by the British cruiser HMS Glasgow. The wreck is a popular dive spot.
SMS Zenta	Austro-Hungarian Navy	World War I: Battle of Antivari: The Zenta-class cruiser was shelled and sunk in the Adriatic Sea off Antivari, Montenegro by Royal Navy and French Navy warships with the loss of 179 of her 308 crew.

== 18 August ==
List of shipwrecks: 18 August 1914
Ship	State	Description
Bowes Castle	United Kingdom	World War I: The cargo ship (4,650 GRT, 1913) was captured and scuttled in the Atlantic Ocean 350 nautical miles (650 km) north by west of Cape Orange, Brazil by SMS Karlsruhe (Imperial German Navy).

== 22 August ==
List of shipwrecks: 22 August 1914
Ship	State	Description
Alice H.	Netherlands	World War I: The cargo ship struck a mine placed by the minelayer Deutschland (Imperial German Navy) and sank in the Baltic Sea off the Kõpu Lighthouse, Estonia.
Capricornus	United Kingdom	World War I: The trawler (194 GRT) was scuttled in the North Sea 85 nautical miles (157 km) east by north of Spurn Point, Yorkshire by a Kaiserliche Marine torpedo boat. Her crew were taken as prisoners of war.
Chr. Broberg	Denmark	World War I: The cargo ship struck a mine and sank in the North Sea.
Houtdik	Netherlands	World War I: The cargo ship struck a mine placed by the minelayer Deutschland (Imperial German Navy) and sank in the Baltic Sea off the Kõpu Lighthouse.
Marnay	United Kingdom	World War I: The trawler (153 GRT) was scuttled in the North Sea 85 nautical miles (157 km) east by north of Spurn Point by a Kaiserliche Marine torpedo boat. Her crew were taken as prisoners of war.
Maryland	Denmark	World War I: The cargo ship struck a mine and sank in the North Sea. Her crew were rescued.
Skirbeck	United Kingdom	World War I: The 110-foot (34 m) trawler (171 GRT) was captured, shelled and sunk in the North Sea 120 miles from Heligoland by minelayer cruiser Albatross (Imperial German Navy). Her crew were taken as prisoners of war. Two died in captivity.
Walrus	United Kingdom	World War I: The trawler (159 GRT) was shelled and sunk in the North Sea by a Kaiserliche Marine cruiser. Her crew were taken as prisoners of war.
Wigtoft	United Kingdom	World War I: The trawler (155 GRT) was shelled and sunk in the North Sea by a Kaiserliche Marine cruiser. Her crew were taken as prisoners of war.

== 23 August ==
List of shipwrecks: 23 August 1914
Ship	State	Description
Flamingo	Austro-Hungarian Navy	World War I: The torpedo boat struck a mine and sank in the Adriatic Sea.
Titania	United Kingdom	The four-masted barquentine was wrecked on Dumhéa Reef, south of Nouméa, New Caledonia (the captain was unaware that the Amadée Lighthouse had been extinguished due to the war).

== 24 August ==
List of shipwrecks: 24 August 1914
Ship	State	Description
Walton	United Kingdom	The tug sank in the Manchester Ship Canal.

== 25 August ==
List of shipwrecks: 25 August 1914
Ship	State	Description
Kesteven	United Kingdom	World War I: The trawler (150 GRT) was scuttled in the North Sea 69 nautical miles (128 km) east north east of the Inner Dowsing Lightship (United Kingdom) by a Kaiserliche Marine torpedo boat. Her crew were taken as prisoners of war.
Lindsey	United Kingdom	World War I: The trawler (144 GRT) was scuttled in the North Sea 70 nautical miles (130 km) east north east of the Inner Dowsing Lightship (United Kingdom) by a Kaiserliche Marine torpedo boat. Her crew were taken as prisoners of war.
Porpoise	United Kingdom	World War I: The trawler (159 GRT) was scuttled in the North Sea 70 nautical miles (130 km) east north east of the Inner Dowsing Lightship (United Kingdom) by a Kaiserliche Marine torpedo boat. Her crew were taken as prisoners of war.

== 26 August ==
List of shipwrecks: 26 August 1914
Ship	State	Description
Admiral Sampson	United States	The cargo ship collided with Princess Victoria (United Kingdom) and sank in Puget Sound off Point No Point, Washington.
Holmwood	United Kingdom	World War I: The cargo ship (4,223 GRT) was captured and sunk in the Atlantic Ocean 180 nautical miles (330 km) east of Pernambuco, Brazil by SMS Dresden (Imperial German Navy).
SMS Kaiser Wilhelm der Grosse	Imperial German Navy	Kaiser Wilhelm der Grosse World War I: Battle of Río de Oro: The armed merchant cruiser was scuttled off Rio de Oro, Spanish Sahara following a battle with HMS Highflyer (Royal Navy)
SMS Magdeburg	Imperial German Navy	SMS Magdeburg World War I: The Magdeburg-class cruiser ran aground in the Baltic Sea off Odensholm, Estonia. She was subsequently attacked by Admiral Makarov and Gromoboi (both Imperial Russian Navy) and sank with the loss of 15 lives.
Skeatti Sogeli	Denmark	World War I: The coaster struck a mine and sank in the North Sea 30 nautical miles (56 km) off Newcastle upon Tyne, Northumberland, United Kingdom.

== 27 August ==
List of shipwrecks: 27 August 1914
Ship	State	Description
Barley Rig	United Kingdom	World War I: The drifter (70 GRT) struck a mine and sank in the North Sea with the loss of five of her nine crew. The survivors were rescued by the trawler St. Clair (United Kingdom).
HMT Crathie	Royal Navy	World War I: The naval trawler (210 GRT, 1911) struck a mine and sank in the North Sea 30 nautical miles (56 km) off the mouth of the River Tyne.
Ena	Norway	World War I: The cargo ship struck a mine and sank in the North Sea 30 nautical miles (56 km) off Newcastle upon Tyne, Northumberland, United Kingdom. Her crew were rescued by a Royal Navy torpedo boat.
Gaea	Denmark	World War I: The three-masted schooner struck a mine and sank in the North Sea with the loss of three of her six crew.
Gottfried	Norway	World War I: The cargo ship struck a mine and sank in the North Sea 30 nautical miles (56 km) off Newcastle upon Tyne.
HMT Thomas W. Irvin	Royal Navy	World War I: The naval trawler (201 GRT, 1911) struck a mine and sank with the loss of three of her twelve crew.

== 28 August ==
List of shipwrecks: 28 August 1914
Ship	State	Description
SMS Ariadne	Imperial German Navy	World War I: Battle of Heligoland Bight: The Gazelle-class light cruiser was shelled and sunk in the Heligoland Bight by HMS Lion, HMS Queen Mary and HMS Princess Royal (all Royal Navy)
SMS Cöln	Imperial German Navy	World War I: Battle of Heligoland Bight: The Kolberg-class light cruiser was shelled and sunk in the Heligoland Bight by HMS Lion, HMS Queen Mary and HMS Princess Royal (all Royal Navy) with the loss of 484 of her 485 crew.
SMS Mainz	Imperial German Navy	Mainz World War I: Battle of Heligoland Bight: The Kolberg-class light cruiser was shelled and sunk in the Heligoland Bight by HMS Lion, HMS Queen Mary and HMS Princess Royal (all Royal Navy) with the loss of 89 of her 437 crew.
SMS V187	Imperial German Navy	World War I: Battle of Heligoland Bight: The V180-class torpedo boat was shelled and sunk in the Heligoland Bight by Royal Navy warships.

== 29 August ==
List of shipwrecks: 29 August 1914
Ship	State	Description
Dargai	United Kingdom	The cargo ship ran aground on the English Bank, in the Atlantic Ocean off Montevideo, Uruguay and was wrecked. Her crew were rescued.
SMS Gerda	Imperial German Navy	The Vorpostenboot was lost on this date.

== 30 August ==
List of shipwrecks: 30 August 1914
Ship	State	Description
Rion	United Kingdom	The tanker was run into by Serrana (United Kingdom) and seriously damaged in the English Channel 9 nautical miles (17 km) south south west of Newhaven, Sussex. She was consequently beached 2 nautical miles (3.7 km) west of Newhaven.

== 31 August ==
List of shipwrecks: 31 August 1914
Ship	State	Description
Floriston	United Kingdom	The cargo ship struck an iceberg in the Atlantic Ocean and was beached at Point Riche, Newfoundland.
Shirotae	Imperial Japanese Navy	World War I, Siege of Tsingtao: The destroyer was wrecked in Kiaochow Bay off Tsingtao, China.
Strathroy	United Kingdom	World War I: The cargo ship (4,336 GRT, 1909) was scuttled in the Atlantic Ocean 100 nautical miles (190 km) north-northeast of Cape São Roque, Brazil by SMS Karlsruhe (Imperial German Navy).

== Unknown date ==
List of shipwrecks: Unknown date 1914
Ship	State	Description
No. 272	Imperial Russian Navy	The torpedo boat sank on 9, 22, or 28 August (sources disagree) after colliding with the steamer Uspekh (flag unknown) off Hersones.
Prince Albert	Canada	The cargo ship was wrecked on the Butterworth Rocks, South Dundas Island, British Columbia. She was later salvaged, repaired and converted to a tug, re-entering service as J R Morgan.
