= SM U-14 (Germany) =

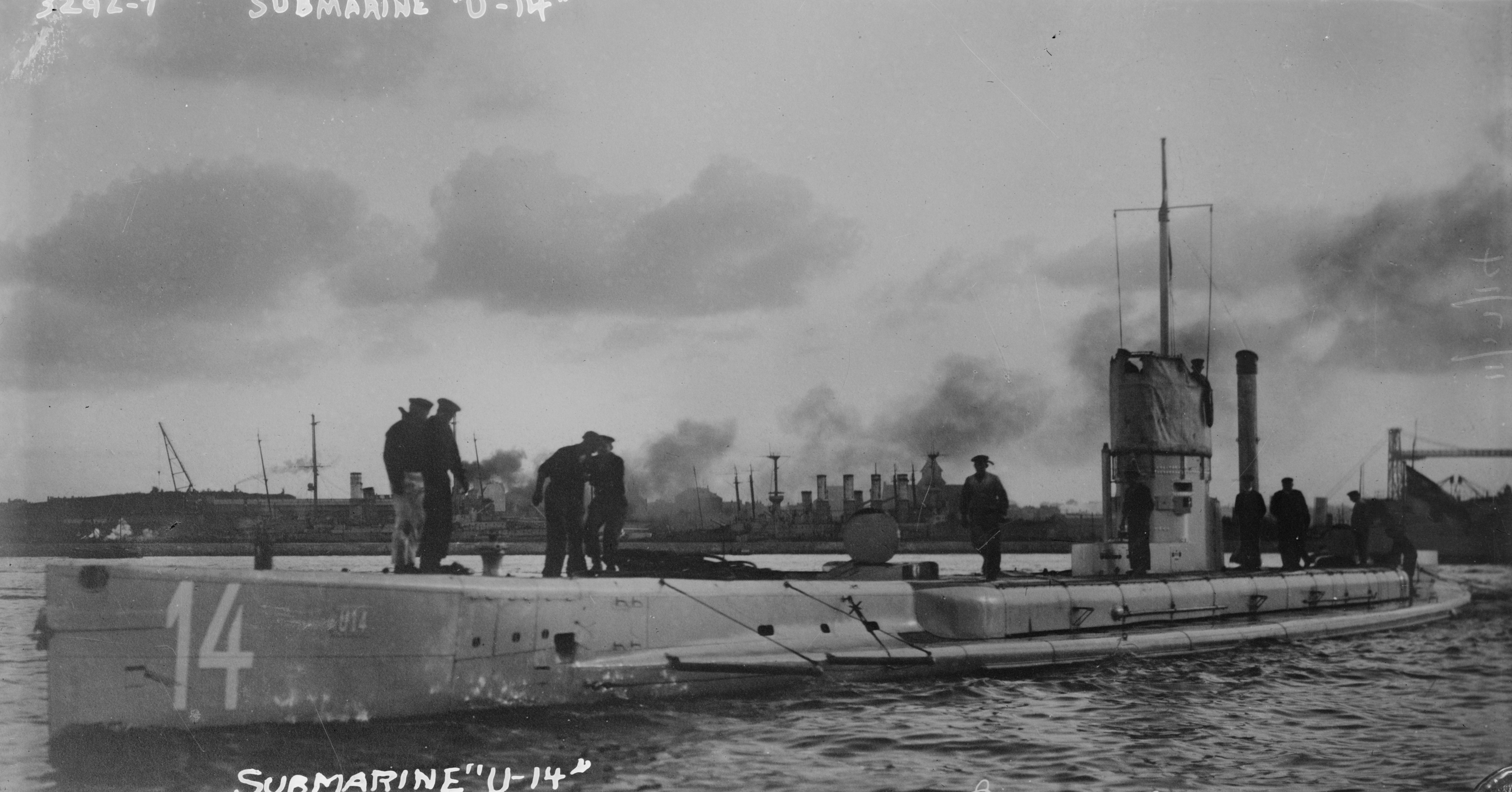
- U-14

History

Germany
- Name: U-14
- Ordered: 23 February 1909
- Builder: Kaiserliche Werft Danzig
- Cost: 2,101,000 Goldmark
- Yard number: 9
- Launched: 11 July 1911
- Commissioned: 24 April 1912
- Fate: Sunk on 5 June 1915

General characteristics
- Class & type: Type U 13 submarine
- Displacement: 516 t (508 long tons) surfaced; 644 t (634 long tons) submerged
- Length: 57.88 m (189 ft 11 in)
- Beam: 6 m (19 ft 8 in)
- Draught: 3.44 m (11 ft 3 in)
- Propulsion: 2 shafts; 2 × Körting 6-cylinder and 2 × Körting 8-cylinder two stroke paraffin motors with 900 PS (660 kW; 890 shp); 2 × SSW electric motors with 1,040 PS (760 kW; 1,030 shp); 550 rpm surfaced; 600 rpm submerged
- Speed: 14.8 knots (27.4 km/h; 17.0 mph) surfaced; 10.7 knots (19.8 km/h; 12.3 mph) submerged
- Range: 2,000 nautical miles (3,700 km; 2,300 mi) at 14 kn
- Test depth: 50 m (160 ft)
- Boats & landing craft carried: 1 dinghy
- Complement: 4 officers, 25 men
- Armament: 4 × 45 cm (17.7 in) torpedo tubes (2 each bow and stern); 6 torpedoes; 1 × 5 cm (2.0 in) SK L/40 gun

Service record
- Part of: I Flotilla; 1 August 1914 – 5 June 1915
- Commanders: Kptlt. Walther Schwieger; 1 August – 15 December 1914; Kptlt. Otto Dröscher; 17 December 1914 – 15 April 1915; Oblt.z.S. Max Hammerle; 16 April – 5 June 1915
- Operations: 1 patrol
- Victories: 2 merchant ships sunk (3,907 GRT)

SM U-14 (Note: "SM" stands for "Seiner Majestät" (English: His Majesty's) and combined with the U for Unterseeboot would be translated as His Majesty's Submarine.) was one of 329 submarines which served in the Imperial German Navy during World War I. A Type U 13 submarine, it sunk two merchant ships during its service before being sunk in June 1915.

== Service history ==
U-14 was ordered in February 1909 and built at Kaiserliche Werft Danzig. The boat was launched in July 1911 and commissioned into the Navy on 24 April 1912. At the start of World War I the boat was commanded by Kapitänleutnant Walther Schwieger. It left port in early August 1914 in a coordinated attack on the British naval base at Scapa Flow, but was unable to reach the target and did not sink any merchant shipping. Both other Type U 13 class boats were lost during the operation, U-13 being lost soon after leaving port and U-15 sunk on 9 August by the light cruiser HMS Birmingham.

Schwieger left the boat in December 1914 to take command of U-20. He was replaced by Kapitänleutnant Otto Dröscher who had previously commanded U-20. On 12 February 1915, U-14 was damaged by an air raid on the German-occupied port of Zeebrugge in Belgium. Dröscher commanded the boat until April 1915, at which time he was replaced as commander by Oberleutnant zur See Max Hammerle.

=== Fate ===
With Hammerle in command U-14 sunk two merchant ships on its final patrol in early June 1915, both of them neutral vessels. The Danish steamer Cyrus en route from Burntisland in Scotland to Copenhagen with a cargo of coal was sunk on 2 June in the North Sea off of Peterhead. The following day the Swedish steamer Lappland, bound for Scotland with a cargo of iron ore, was torpedoed close by.

On 5 June, U-14 approached the trawler Oceanic II, again off Peterhead, firing a series of warning shots. Oceanic II was an armed Q-ship and returned fire, before being joined by the armed trawler Hawk. U-14 was hit several times, and, unable to escape by submerging, sank at 57°16′N 1°16′E after being rammed by Hawk. Six officers and 21 ratings were captured, although Hammerle, the U-boat's commanding officer, died after refusing to leave the boat.

== Summary of raiding history ==
Both ships that U-14 sunk were neutral vessels carrying cargo to or from the United Kingdom. The combined tonnage of the vessels was 3,907 GRT.

Date	Ship name	Nationality	Tonnage (Note: Tonnages are in gross register tons)	Fate
2 June 1915	Cyrus	Denmark	1,669	Sunk
3 June 1915	Lappland	Sweden	2,238	Sunk
