= German submarine U-138 =

U-138 may refer to one of the following German submarines:

- SM U-138, a Type U 127 submarine launched in 1917 and that served in the First World War
  - During the First World War, Germany also had this submarine with a similar name:
    - SM UB-138, a Type UB III submarine laid down but unfinished at the end of the war; broken up on the slip in 1919
- German submarine U-138 (1940), a Type IID submarine that served in the Second World War until sunk on 18 June 1941
