= U20 =

U20 or U-20 may refer to:

== Naval vessels ==
- German submarine U-20
- HMS Snipe (U20), a sloop of the Royal Navy
- SM U-20 (Austria-Hungary), a submarine of the Austro-Hungarian Navy

== Other uses ==
- Great truncated cuboctahedron
- Meizu U20, a smartphone
- Roland U-20, a synthesizer
- Small nucleolar RNA SNORD20
- U20 summit, an international summit for cities from the G-20 countries
- Under-20 athletics
- Uppland Runic Inscription 20
