= U10 =

U10 may refer to:

== Naval vessels ==
- German submarine U-10, various vessels
- HMIS Cauvery (U10), a sloop of the Royal Indian Navy, and later the Indian Navy, as INS Cauvery
- U-10-class submarine of the Austro-Hungarian Navy
  - SM U-10 (Austria-Hungary), the lead boat of the class

== Other uses ==
- U10 (Berlin U-Bahn), a planned transit line
- Helio U-10 Courier, an American utility aircraft
- Iriver U10, a portable music player
- London Buses route U10
- Meizu U10, a Chinese smartphone
- Rhombicuboctahedron
- Toyota Coaster (U10), a Japanese minibus
- Uppland Runic Inscription 10
