= U11 =

U11 may refer to:

== Naval vessels ==
- Brazilian transport Duque de Caxias (U11)
- German submarine U-11, various vessels
- HMS Lark (U11), a sloop of the Royal Navy
- SM U-11 (Austria-Hungary), a submarine of the Austro-Hungarian Navy

== Other uses ==
- U11 (Berlin U-Bahn), a planned transit line
- U11 (Nuremberg U-Bahn), a discontinued transit line
- BMW X1 (U11), a German crossover
- HTC U11, a smartphone
- Nissan Bluebird (U11), a Japanese sedan
- Truncated cuboctahedron
- U11 spliceosomal RNA
- Udet U 11 Kondor, a German prototype airliner
- Uppland Runic Inscription 11
