= German submarine U-132 =

U-132 may refer to one of the following German submarines:

- SM U-132, a Type U 127 submarine laid down during the First World War but unfinished at the end of the war; broken up incomplete 1919–20
  - During the First World War, Germany also had this submarine with a similar name:
    - SM UB-132, a Type UB III submarine launched in 1918 and that served in the First World War until surrendered on 21 November 1918; broken up at Swansea
- German submarine U-132 (1941), a Type VIIC submarine that served in the Second World War until sunk 4 November 1942
