= Type Large MS submarine =

Class overview
- Builders: AG Weser, Bremen, Kaiserliche Werft Danzig
- Operators: Imperial German Navy
- Preceded by: Type 93
- Subclasses: U 131 group, U 135 group
- Planned: 8
- Completed: 2
- Canceled: 6
- Lost: 1

General characteristics
- Displacement: 1,221 tonnes (1,202 long tons) surfaced; 1,649 tonnes (1,623 long tons) submerged (U 131 group); 1,175 tonnes (1,156 long tons) surfaced; 1,534 tonnes (1,510 long tons) submerged (U 135 group)
- Length: 83.5 m (273 ft 11 in) (o/a); 65.57 m (215 ft 1 in) (pressure hull)
- Beam: 7.54 m (24 ft 9 in) (o/a); 4.85 m (15 ft 11 in) (pressure hull)
- Height: 9.46 m (31 ft 0 in)
- Draught: 4.26 m (14 ft 0 in)
- Propulsion: 3,500 hp (2,600 kW) surfaced; 1,690 hp (1,260 kW) submerged
- Speed: 17.0 knots (31.5 km/h; 19.6 mph) surfaced, and 8.1 knots (15.0 km/h; 9.3 mph) submerged
- Range: 10,000 nmi (19,000 km; 12,000 mi) at 8 kn surfaced, and 50 nmi (93 km; 58 mi) at 4.5 kn submerged
- Test depth: 75 m (246 ft 1 in)
- Complement: 46 men
- Armament: Four 50 cm (20 in) torpedo tubes forward and two 50 cm torpedo tubes aft with 14 torpedoes. Two 10.5 cm (4.1 in) deck gun with 540 rounds

The Type Large MS submarine was a class of submarine of the Imperial German Navy that was intended for deep sea usage and was very seaworthy, relatively comfortable and had average maneuverability.

List of Type Large MS submarines
Boat	Fate
U-135	surrendered 1918, sunk as a target off Eddystone in 1921
U-136	French war reparation, scrapped in Cherbourg 1921
U-137	unknown, probably broken up
U-138	unknown, probably broken up
