= German submarine U-13 =

U-13 may refer to one of the following German submarines:

- SM U-13, was the lead ship of the Type U 13 class of submarines; launched in 1910 and served in the First World War until lost between 6 and 12 August 1914
  - During the First World War, Germany also had these submarines with similar names:
    - SM UB-13, a Type UB I submarine launched in 1915 and sunk on 24 April 1916
    - SM UC-13, a Type UC I submarine launched in 1915 and grounded on 29 November 1915
- German submarine U-13 (1935), a Type IIB submarine that served in the Second World War and was sunk on 31 May 1940
- German submarine U-13 (S192), a Type 206 submarine of the Bundesmarine that was launched in 1973 and scrapped in 1997
