= German submarine U-10 =

U-10 may refer to one of the following German submarines:

- SM U-10 (Germany), was a Type U 9 submarine launched in 1911 and that served in the First World War until sunk on 30 June 1916
  - During the First World War, Germany also had these submarines with similar names:
    - SM UB-10, a Type UB I submarine launched in 1915 and scuttled on 5 October 1918
    - SM UC-10, a Type UC I submarine launched in 1915 and sunk 21 August 1916
- German submarine U-10 (1935), a Type IIB submarine that served in the Second World War and was stricken on 1 August 1944
- German submarine U-10 (S189), a Type 205 submarine of the Bundesmarine that was launched in 1967; sold in 1993; now a museum ship in Wilhelmshaven
