= Walther Schwieger =

German military officer (1885–1917)

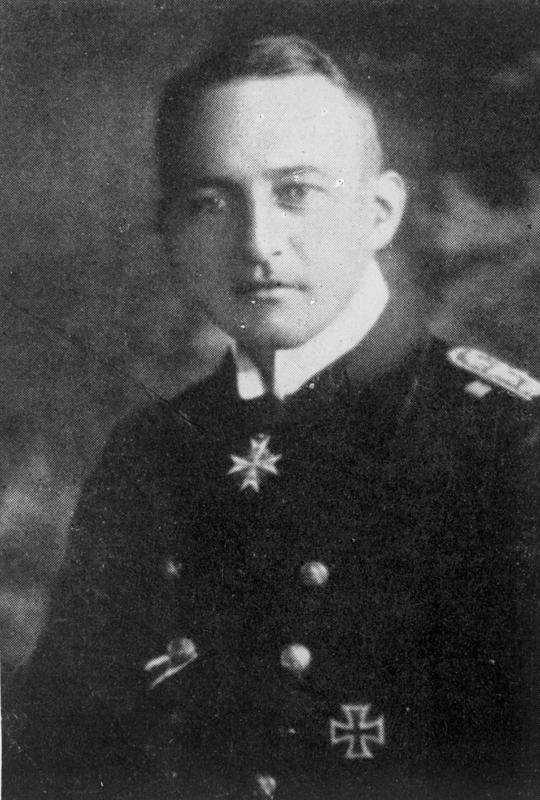
- Schwieger in 1917
- Born: 7 April 1885; Berlin, German Empire
- Died: 5 September 1917 (aged 32); North Sea, off Terschelling, Netherlands
- Military career
- Allegiance: Germany
- Branch: Imperial German Navy
- Service years: 1903–1917
- Rank: Kapitänleutnant
- Commands: U-14, 1 August – 15 December 1914; U-20, 16 December 1914 – 5 November 1916; U-88, 23 July 1916 – 5 September 1917
- Conflicts: World War I U-boat Campaign; Sinking of RMS Lusitania
- Awards: Pour le Mérite, Iron Cross First & Second Class, Royal House Order of Hohenzollern, Order of the Crown (Prussia)

Kapitänleutnant Wilhelm Otto Walther Schwieger (7 April 1885 – 5 September 1917) was a German military officer. He was a U-boat commander in the Imperial German Navy (Kaiserliche Marine) during First World War. In 1915, he sank the passenger liner RMS Lusitania with the loss of 1,198 lives.

== Military career ==
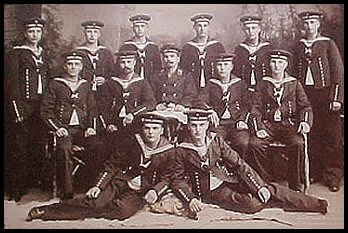
Schwieger (bottom right) in a 1906 group photograph of torpedo division students

Born at Berlin in 1885, Schwieger joined the Imperial German Navy in 1903. From 1911 he served with the U-boat Service and in 1912 took over command of U-14. After the outbreak of World War I in 1914 he was promoted to Kapitänleutnant and in December 1914 was given command of U-20. As a submarine captain, Schwieger has been noted for his cavalier approach to attacking without being sure about the identity or nationality of his target, sometimes in breach of orders to the contrary. His policy has been described as "shoot first and ask questions later".

On 1 February 1915, he ordered an attack on the hospital ship HMHS Asturias, misidentified as a troop transport, in which the torpedo failed to detonate.

On 7 May 1915, Schwieger was responsible for U-20 sinking passenger liner RMS Lusitania leading to the deaths of 1,199 people, an event that played a role in the United States' later entry into World War I. He also torpedoed RMS Hesperian on 4 September 1915 and SS Cymric on 8 May 1916. On 31 May 1917, his U-boat U-88 sank the Miyazaki Maru during that ship's voyage from Yokohama to London, causing the loss of eight lives.

== Death ==
Schwieger was killed in action on 5 September 1917. His U-boat U-88 most likely struck a mine. It sank north of Terschelling at 53°57′N 4°55′E with the loss of all 43 hands.

During his wartime career, Schwieger captained three different submarines, on a total of 34 missions. He sank 49 ships, measuring 183,883 gross register tons (GRT).

== In popular culture ==
Schwieger is portrayed in the docudrama Lusitania: Terror At Sea in 2007, where he is played by actor Florian Panzner.
