= German submarine U-128 =

U-128 may refer to one of the following German submarines:

- SM U-128, a Type U 127 submarine laid down during the First World War but unfinished at the end of the war; broken up incomplete 1919–20
  - During the First World War, Germany also had this submarine with a similar name:
    - SM UB-128, a Type UB III submarine launched in 1918 and surrendered on 3 February 1919; dumped on beach at Falmouth after explosive trials 1921 and broken up in situ
- German submarine U-128 (1941), a Type IXC submarine that served in the Second World War until sunk on 17 May 1943
