= U13 =

U13 may refer to:

- German submarine U-13, various vessels
- Nissan Bluebird (U13), a Japanese sedan
- Small cubicuboctahedron
- Uppland Runic Inscription 13
