= Kaiserliche Werft Danzig 1650 =

No. 1650

General information
- Type: Reconnaissance seaplane
- National origin: Germany
- Manufacturer: Kaiserliche Werft Danzig
- Number built: 1

Number 1650 was the sole example of a unique seaplane design produced for the flying service of the Imperial German Navy during the First World War. From 1916 onwards, the Kaiserliche Werften produced a range of training seaplanes for the Navy, in order to free the nation's major seaplane manufacturers to produce front-line types. During the closing stages of the war, however, the Kaiserliche Werft Danzig and Kaiserliche Werft Wilhelmshaven produced a small number of front-line types as well, including this machine. Number 1650 was an armed reconnaissance seaplane equipped with radio equipment capable of transmission and reception, therefore gaining the naval CHFT classification.

== Specifications ==
Data from Kroschel & Stützer 1994, p.165

General characteristics

- Crew: Two, pilot and observer
- Powerplant: 1 × Mercedes D.IV , 160 kW (220 hp)

Armament

- 1 × trainable 7.9 mm machine gun
