= SM U-88 =

German submarine (launched 1916)

History

Germany
- Name: U-88
- Ordered: 23 June 1915
- Builder: Kaiserliche Werft Danzig
- Yard number: 32
- Laid down: 20 November 1915
- Launched: 22 June 1916
- Commissioned: 7 April 1917
- Fate: 5 September 1917 - Presumably mined off Terschelling. 43 dead (all hands lost)

General characteristics
- Class & type: Type U 87 submarine
- Displacement: 757 t (745 long tons) surfaced; 998 t (982 long tons) submerged
- Length: 65.80 m (215 ft 11 in) (o/a); 50.07 m (164 ft 3 in) (pressure hull)
- Beam: 6.20 m (20 ft 4 in) (oa); 4.18 m (13 ft 9 in) (pressure hull)
- Height: 9.35 m (30 ft 8 in)
- Draught: 3.88 m (12 ft 9 in)
- Installed power: 2 × 2,400 PS (1,765 kW; 2,367 shp) surfaced; 2 × 1,200 PS (883 kW; 1,184 shp) submerged
- Propulsion: 2 shafts, 2 × 1.66 m (5 ft 5 in) propellers
- Speed: 15.6 knots (28.9 km/h; 18.0 mph) surfaced; 8.6 knots (15.9 km/h; 9.9 mph) submerged
- Range: 11,380 nmi (21,080 km; 13,100 mi) at 8 knots (15 km/h; 9.2 mph) surfaced; 56 nmi (104 km; 64 mi) at 5 knots (9.3 km/h; 5.8 mph) submerged
- Test depth: 50 m (160 ft)
- Complement: 4 officers, 32 enlisted
- Armament: 4 × 50 cm (19.7 in) torpedo tubes (two bow, two stern); 10-12 torpedoes; 1 × 10.5 cm (4.1 in) SK L/45 deck gun; 1 × 8.8 cm (3.5 in) SK L/30 deck gun (?)

Service record
- Part of: III Flotilla; 18 May – 5 September 1917
- Commanders: Kptlt. Walther Schwieger; 23 July 1916 – 5 September 1917
- Operations: 4 patrols
- Victories: 11 merchant ships sunk (33,053 GRT); 1 auxiliary warship sunk (6,329 GRT); 2 merchant ships damaged (845 GRT)

SM U-88 (Note: "SM" stands for "Seiner Majestät" (English: His Majesty's) and combined with the U for Unterseeboot would be translated as His Majesty's Submarine.) was a Type U 87 submarine built for the Imperial German Navy (Kaiserliche Marine) in World War I. U-88 was engaged in the naval warfare and took part in the First Battle of the Atlantic.

U-88 is most notable for sinking and taking with her Kapitänleutnant Walther Schwieger, responsible for sinking the RMS Lusitania when he was commander of U-20. The submarine sank on 5 September 1917 when she presumably struck a British mine in the North Sea north of Terschelling at 53°57′N 4°55′E. Everyone on board U-88 was killed.

== Design ==
Type U 87 submarines were preceded by the shorter Type U 81 submarines. U-88 had a displacement of 757 tonnes (745 long tons) when at the surface and 998 tonnes (982 long tons) while submerged. She had a total length of 65.80 m (215 ft 11 in), a pressure hull length of 50.07 m (164 ft 3 in), a beam of 6.20 m (20 ft 4 in), a height of 9.35 m (30 ft 8 in), and a draught of 3.88 m (12 ft 9 in). The submarine was powered by two 2,400 metric horsepower (1,800 kW; 2,400 shp) engines for use while surfaced, and two 1,200 metric horsepower (880 kW; 1,200 shp) engines for use while submerged. She had two propeller shafts. She was capable of operating at depths of up to 50 metres (160 ft).

The submarine had a maximum surface speed of 15.6 knots (28.9 km/h; 18.0 mph) and a maximum submerged speed of 8.6 knots (15.9 km/h; 9.9 mph). When submerged, she could operate for 56 nautical miles (104 km; 64 mi) at 5 knots (9.3 km/h; 5.8 mph); when surfaced, she could travel 11,380 nautical miles (21,080 km; 13,100 mi) at 8 knots (15 km/h; 9.2 mph). U-88 was fitted with four 50 centimetres (20 in) torpedo tubes (two at the bow and two at the stern), ten to twelve torpedoes, one 10.5 cm (4.1 in) SK L/45 deck gun, and probably one 8.8 cm (3.5 in) SK L/30 deck gun. She had a complement of thirty-six (thirty-two crew members and four officers).

== Summary of raiding history ==
Date	Name	Nationality	Tonnage (Note: Tonnages are in gross register tons)	Fate
23 May 1917	Hector	Norway	1,146	Sunk
25 May 1917	HMS Hilary	Royal Navy	6,329	Sunk
28 May 1917	Roma	Russian Empire	417	Damaged
29 May 1917	Ashleaf	United Kingdom	5,768	Sunk
31 May 1917	Jeanne Cordonnier	France	2,194	Sunk
31 May 1917	Miyazaki Maru	Japan	7,892	Sunk
1 June 1917	Cavina	United Kingdom	6,539	Sunk
6 June 1917	Eemdijk	Netherlands	3,048	Sunk
7 June 1917	John Bakke	Norway	1,611	Sunk
29 June 1917	Escondido	Norway	1,066	Sunk
3 July 1917	Iceland	United Kingdom	1,501	Sunk
7 July 1917	Coral Leaf	United Kingdom	428	Damaged
13 July 1917	Ceres	Denmark	1,166	Sunk
16 July 1917	Vesta	Denmark	1,122	Sunk

== Bibliography ==
- Gröner, Erich; Jung, Dieter; Maass, Martin (1991). U-boats and Mine Warfare Vessels. German Warships 1815–1945. Vol. 2. Translated by Thomas, Keith; Magowan, Rachel. London: Conway Maritime Press. ISBN 0-85177-593-4.
