= Kaiserliche Werft Danzig 467 =

Unique seaplane design

No. 467–470

General information
- Type: Training seaplane
- National origin: Germany
- Manufacturer: Kaiserliche Werft Danzig
- Primary user: Imperial German Navy
- Number built: 4

History
- First flight: 1916

Numbers 467 to 470 were four examples of a unique seaplane design produced for the flying service of the Imperial German Navy during the First World War. These four aircraft were the subject of an order by the Navy for trainer seaplanes for the base at Putzig, at a time when most trainers were merely obsolete front-line types.

Construction of these unarmed two-seat biplanes took place between October 1916 and March 1917., ahead of a separate order for two more machines of different design that had been assigned lower serial numbers by the Navy (404–405).

== Specifications ==
Data from Kroschel & Stützer 1994, p.154, Gray & Thetford 1962, p.450

General characteristics

- Crew: Two, pilot and instructor
- Length: 9.10 m (29 ft 10 in)
- Wingspan: 15.68 m (51 ft 5 in)
- Height: 3.67 m (12 ft 1 in)
- Wing area: 52.0 m^{2} (562 sq ft)
- Empty weight: 1,063 kg (2,339 lb)
- Gross weight: 1,632 kg (3,690 lb)
- Powerplant: 1 × Benz Bz.III , 110 kW (150 hp)

Performance

- Maximum speed: 128 km/h (80 mph, 70 kn)
- Rate of climb: 1.1 m/s (220 ft/min)
