= Kaiserliche Werft Danzig 404 =

World War I-era German Seaplane design

No. 404 and 405

General information
- Type: Training seaplane
- National origin: Germany
- Manufacturer: Kaiserliche Werft Danzig
- Primary user: Imperial German Navy
- Number built: 2

History
- First flight: 1917

Numbers 404 and 405 were the sole two examples of a unique seaplane design produced for the flying service of the Imperial German Navy during the First World War. By 1917, the output of the major German seaplane manufacturers was taken up producing machines for front-line service. As a consequence, the only machines available for training purposes were those that had been made obsolete or which had been damaged and rebuilt. In order to provide modern trainers for the Navy, the Kaiserliche Werft Danzig undertook the design and construction of two brand-new seaplanes between March and June, unarmed two-seat biplanes. These machines were supplied to the naval base at Putzig along with a batch of four trainers of a different design, numbered 467–470.

== Specifications ==
Data from Kroschel & Stützer 1994, p.154

General characteristics

- Crew: Two, pilot and instructor
- Powerplant: 1 × Mercedes D.I , 80 kW (107 hp)
