= SM U-137 =

German U-boat

History

German Empire
- Name: U-137
- Ordered: 27 May 1916
- Builder: Kaiserliche Werft Danzig
- Launched: 16 December 1916
- Commissioned: 8 January 1918
- Fate: Unknown

General characteristics
- Class & type: Type U 127 submarine
- Displacement: 1,175 t (1,156 long tons) surfaced; 1,534 t (1,510 long tons) submerged
- Length: 83.50 m (273 ft 11 in) o/a; 65.75 m (215 ft 9 in) pressure hull
- Beam: 7.54 m (24 ft 9 in) o/a; 4.85 m (15 ft 11 in) pressure hull
- Height: 9.46 m (31 ft)
- Draught: 4.26 m (14 ft 0 in)
- Installed power: 2 × MAN diesel engines, 3,400 bhp (2,500 kW) total; 2 × diesel generators for surface dash, 890 bhp (660 kW) total; 2 × electric motors, 1,670 shp (1,240 kW) total
- Propulsion: 2 × propeller shafts
- Speed: 17 knots (31 km/h; 20 mph) surfaced; 9.1 knots (16.9 km/h; 10.5 mph) submerged
- Range: 10,000 nmi (19,000 km; 12,000 mi) at 8 knots (15 km/h; 9.2 mph) surfaced; 50 nmi (93 km; 58 mi) at 4.5 knots (8.3 km/h; 5.2 mph) submerged
- Test depth: 75 m (246 ft)
- Complement: 44 men
- Armament: 6 × torpedo tubes (4 bow, 2 stern); 16 × torpedoes; 1 × 15 cm (5.9 in) SK L/45 deck gun with 220 rounds; 1 × 8.8 cm (3.5 in) SK L/30 deck gun

Service record
- Operations: None
- Victories: None

SM U-137 (Note: "SM" stands for "Seiner Majestät" (English: His Majesty's) and combined with the U for Unterseeboot would be translated as His Majesty's Submarine.) was a Type U 127 U-boat of the Imperial German Navy during World War I. Her construction was ordered on 27 May 1916 and her keel was laid down by Kaiserliche Werft Danzig. She was launched on 16 December 1916 and she was commissioned on 8 January 1918. She made no war patrols.

== Bibliography ==
- Gröner, Erich; Jung, Dieter; Maass, Martin (1991). U-boats and Mine Warfare Vessels. German Warships 1815–1945. Vol. 2. Translated by Thomas, Keith; Magowan, Rachel. London: Conway Maritime Press. ISBN 0-85177-593-4.
