= Kaiserliche Werft Danzig 1105 =

WW1 Seaplane of the Imperial German Navy

No. 1105–1106
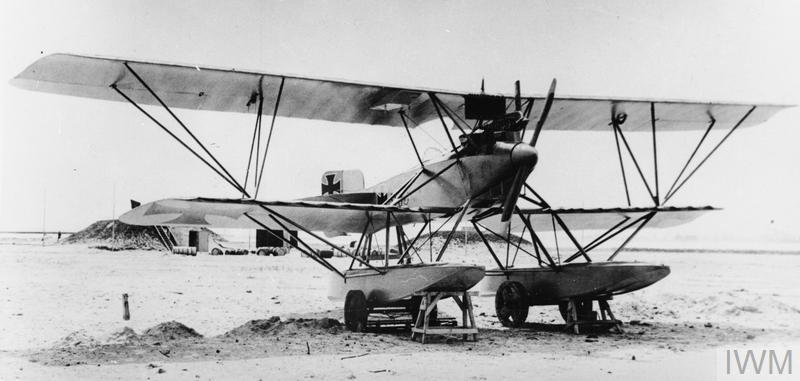
- A Kaiserliche Werft Danzig floatplane with axles underneath the floats to allow for ground maneuvering

General information
- Type: Training seaplane
- National origin: Germany
- Manufacturer: Kaiserliche Werft Danzig
- Primary user: Imperial German Navy
- Number built: 2

History
- First flight: 1917

Imperial German Navy seaplanes numbers 1105 and 1106 were the only examples of a unique design produced for the navy's flying service during the First World War. They were unarmed biplanes of conventional configuration with staggered wings of unequal span. The empennage included a sizable ventral fin. Intended as training aircraft, the pilot and instructor sat in tandem, open cockpits. The undercarriage consisted of twin pontoons. The interplane strut arrangement was remarkable for its day, consisting of N-struts and V-struts without any rigging wires.

These machines were supplied to the naval base at Putzig at the end of 1917.

== Specifications ==
Data from Kroschel & Stützer 1994, p.164; Gray & Thetford, p.450

General characteristics

- Crew: Two, pilot and instructor
- Length: 8.85 m (29 ft 0 in)
- Wingspan: 14.10 m (46 ft 3 in)
- Height: 3.73 m (12 ft 3 in)
- Powerplant: 1 × Benz Bz.III , 110 kW (150 hp)
