= German submarine U-11 =

U-11 may refer to one of the following German submarines:

- SM U-11 (Germany), was a Type U 9 submarine launched in 1911 and that served in the First World War until sunk on 9 December 1914
  - During the First World War, Germany also had these submarines with similar names:
    - SM UB-11, a Type UB I submarine launched in 1915 and stricken on 19 February 1919
    - SM UC-11, a Type UC I submarine launched in 1915 and sunk 26 June 1918
- German submarine U-11 (1935), a Type IIB submarine that served in the Second World War and was stricken on 5 January 1945; scuttled 2 May 1945
- German submarine U-11 (S190), a Type 205 submarine of the Bundesmarine that was launched in 1968; decommissioned in 2003; now a museum ship in Burgstaaken, Fehmarn
