= SMS Freya (1897) =

Protected cruiser of the German Imperial Navy

- Freya early in her career, before her 1907 reconstruction

History

German Empire
- Name: Freya
- Namesake: Freya
- Builder: Kaiserliche Werft, Danzig
- Laid down: 2 January 1896
- Launched: 27 April 1897
- Commissioned: 20 October 1898
- Stricken: 25 January 1920
- Fate: Scrapped in 1921

General characteristics
- Class & type: Victoria Louise-class cruiser
- Displacement: Normal: 5,660 t (5,570 long tons); Full load: 6,491 t (6,388 long tons)
- Length: 110.6 m (363 ft)
- Beam: 17.4 m (57 ft)
- Draft: 6.58 m (21.6 ft)
- Installed power: 12 × Niclausse boilers; 10,000 PS (9,900 ihp)
- Propulsion: 3 × triple-expansion steam engines; 3 × screw propellers
- Speed: 18.4 knots (34.1 km/h; 21.2 mph)
- Range: 3,412 nmi (6,319 km; 3,926 mi) at 12 kn (22 km/h; 14 mph)
- Complement: 31 officers; 446 enlisted men
- Armament: 2 × 21 cm (8.3 in) guns; 8 × 15 cm (5.9 in) guns; 10 × 8.8 cm (3.5 in) guns; 10 × 3.7 cm (1.5 in) Maxim machine cannon; 3 × 45 cm (17.7 in) torpedo tubes
- Armor: Deck: 4 to 10 cm (1.6 to 3.9 in); Turrets: 10 cm; Casemates: 10 cm; Conning tower: 15 cm (5.9 in)

SMS Freya was a protected cruiser of the Victoria Louise class, built for the German Imperial Navy (Kaiserliche Marine) in the 1890s, along with her sister ships Victoria Louise, Hertha, Vineta, and Hansa. Freya was laid down at the Imperial Dockyard in Danzig in 1895, launched in April 1897, and commissioned into the Navy in October 1898. The ship was armed with a battery of two 21 cm guns and eight 15 cm guns and had a top speed of 19 knots (35 km/h; 22 mph). Though the five Victoria Louise-class cruisers proved to be disappointing in some ways, they marked the beginning of a decade of German cruiser construction.

Freya served as a gunnery training ship for the German fleet for the initial years of her career, unlike her sister ships, all of which served abroad on foreign stations. As a result, she led a fairly uneventful career; in addition to conducting shooting practice, she also participated in training exercises with the fleet between 1901 and 1904. After a modernization in 1905–1907, Freya was used as a school ship for cadets, and over the next several years embarked on training cruises. Two major cruises to the Mediterranean took place in 1908 and 1909, and in 1910, Freya crossed the Atlantic to visit Mexico, along with islands in the Caribbean Sea.

Another major refit followed between 1911 and 1913, after which she was placed in the reserve fleet. At the outbreak of World War I, Freya was mobilized into V Scouting Group, but served in front-line duty only briefly. After a serious accident that nearly sank the ship in August 1914, she was returned to use as a training ship, a role she filled for the rest of the war. She was ultimately sold for scrapping in 1921.

== Design ==
In the early 1890s, elements in the German naval command structure grappled with what type of cruiser ought to be built to fulfill the various needs of the fleet. The Reichsmarineamt (RMA—Imperial Navy Office) preferred to build a combination of large cruisers of around 6,000 t (5,900 long tons) along the lines of SMS Kaiserin Augusta and significantly smaller vessels of about 1,500 t (1,476 long tons) to support them, while the Oberkommando der Marine (Naval High Command) argued that a uniform force of 3,000 t (2,953 long tons) cruisers was preferable. In the event, the RMA carried the day and three 6,000-ton cruisers were authorized in 1895; this was in part due to the intervention of Kaiser Wilhelm II and in part due to comparisons with foreign contemporaries, like the United States' Baltimore and the Austro-Hungarian Kaiserin und Königin Maria Theresia. The experience of Japanese cruisers during the contemporaneous First Sino-Japanese War showed the benefit of larger 21 cm (8.3 in) guns, which were adopted for the main battery of the Victoria Louise class.

They resembled the larger Kaiser Friedrich III-class battleships, designed at the same time, albeit at reduced scale. The new cruisers proved to be unsatisfactory as fleet cruisers, because they were too slow and they lacked sufficient armor protection. They nevertheless provided good service as overseas cruisers and later as training ships. They (along with the contemporaneous armored cruiser Fürst Bismarck) nevertheless marked the beginning of a trend of German cruiser construction that lasted through the Scharnhorst-class cruisers built a decade later.

=== Characteristics ===
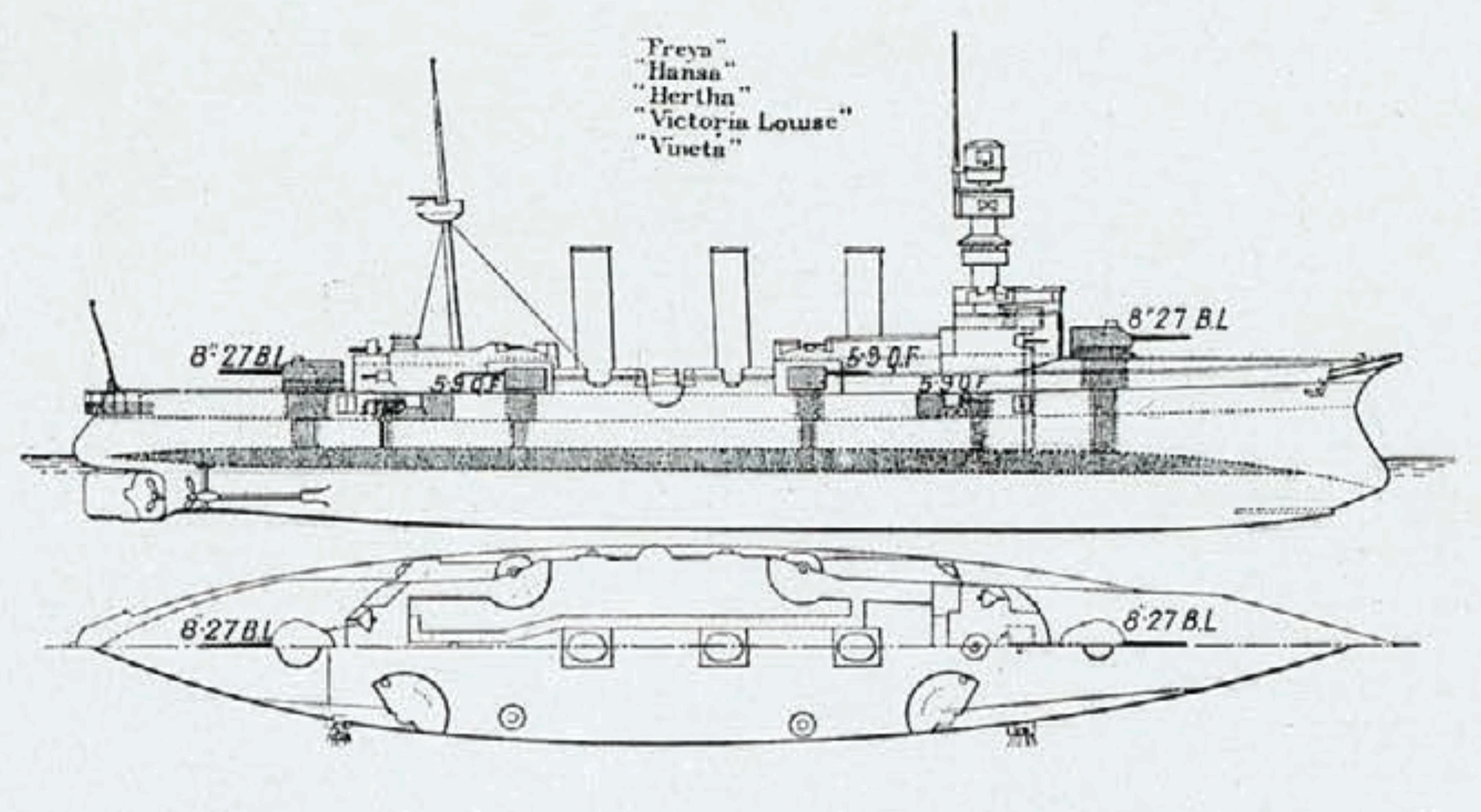
Plan and profile drawing of the Victoria Louise class

Freya was 110.6 meters (363 ft) long overall and had a beam of 17.4 m (57 ft) and a draft of 6.58 m (21.6 ft) forward. As designed, she displaced 5,660 t (5,570 long tons), and at full load, her displacement rose to 6,491 t (6,388 long tons). The ship's superstructure included a large conning tower forward and a smaller deck house further aft. She was fitted with a heavy military mast atop the conning tower and a lighter pole mast further aft. Her hull featured a flared clipper bow combined with a pronounced ram. The ship had a crew of 31 officers and 446 enlisted men.

Her propulsion system consisted of three vertical 4-cylinder triple-expansion steam engines, each driving a single screw propeller. Steam was provided by twelve coal-fired Niclausse boilers, which were vented through three funnels. Her engines were rated for 10,000 metric horsepower (9,900 ihp), and provided a top speed of 19 knots (35 km/h; 22 mph). Coal storage amounted to 950 t (930 long tons; 1,050 short tons) if all available spaces were used. The ship had a range of approximately 3,412 nautical miles (6,319 km; 3,926 mi) at the more economical speed of 12 kn (22 km/h; 14 mph).

The ship was armed with a main battery of two 21 cm (8.3 in) SK L/40 guns in single gun turrets, one forward and one aft. The guns were supplied with 58 rounds of ammunition each. They had a range of 16,300 m (53,500 ft). Freya also carried a secondary battery of eight 15 cm (5.9 in) SK L/40 guns. Four were mounted in turrets amidships and the other four were placed in casemates, two abreast the conning tower and the others abreast the mainmast. These guns had a range of 13,700 m (44,900 ft). She also carried ten 8.8 cm (3.5 in) SK L/30 guns for defense against torpedo boats. The gun armament was rounded out by ten 3.7 cm (1.5 in) Maxim machine cannon. She was also equipped with three 45 cm (17.7 in) torpedo tubes with eight torpedoes, two launchers were mounted on the broadside and the third was in the bow, all below the waterline.

The ship was protected with Krupp armor; her deck was 4 cm (1.6 in) on the horizontal with sloped sides that were 10 cm (3.9 in) thick. Her main and secondary battery turrets had 10 cm thick sides and the secondary casemates had the same level of protection. The conning tower had 15 cm thick sides.

=== Modifications ===
Between 1905 and 1907, Freya underwent a major reconstruction at the Kaiserliche Werft (Imperial Shipyard) in Wilhelmshaven to convert her into a training ship for naval cadets. Her military mast was removed to reduce the top-heaviness of the ship, which improved her handling in turns. Two of the 15 cm guns and all of the Maxim guns were removed, and an eleventh 8.8 cm SK L/30 gun was installed, along with three 8.8 cm SK L/35 guns. Some parts of the ship, including the casemates for the 15 cm guns that were removed, were converted into berthing spaces for cadets.

She underwent a second major refit in 1911–1913 at the Kaiserliche Werft in Danzig. This included replacing her boilers with new Navy-type models, and the funnels were reduced to two. In 1916, all of the ships of the class were disarmed, with the exception of Freya, which was re-equipped with a single 15 cm gun, four 10.5 cm SK L/45 guns, and fourteen 8.8 cm guns of both the L/30 and L/35 versions, for use as a gunnery training ship. In April 1918, her torpedo tubes were removed. By that time, her gun armament had been revised to two 15 cm guns and four 10.5 cm guns.

== Service history ==
=== Construction and fleet service ===
Freya was ordered under the contract name "Ersatz Freya", (Note: German warships were ordered under provisional names. Additions to the fleet were given a single letter; ships intended to replace older or lost vessels were ordered as "Ersatz (name of the ship to be replaced)".) and was laid down at the Kaiserliche Werft in Danzig on 2 January 1896. She was launched on 27 April 1897; Prince Heinrich of Prussia gave a speech at the ceremony and Queen Charlotte of Württemberg christened the ship. After completing fitting-out work, she began builder's sea trials, which revealed significant problems with her boilers, prompting the navy to issue a formal complaint to the manufacturer, Friedrich Krupp Germaniawerft, which was forced to provide replacements. Additional problems led the navy to turn to the British Thornycroft boiler, which the design staff of the RMA developed further, leading to what would become the Marine-type boiler. These would be used on most German warships thereafter. Freya was commissioned on 20 October 1898 for additional sea trials, conducted by the navy. During this period, she was officially assigned to II Division of I Battle Squadron, replacing the old ironclad warship Sachsen, though she was not yet ready for active service. In March 1899, Freya was lightly damaged in a collision with a vessel under construction for the Ottoman Empire, after the latter vessel broke free from her moorings. The ship's first commander, Kapitän zur See (KzS—Captain at Sea) Hugo Westphal, arrived aboard the ship in October 1900. Freya occasionally took part in training exercises with other elements of the fleet through mid-1901, though she remained on trials until 8 June, when she was decommissioned. She was now, finally, ready for active service.

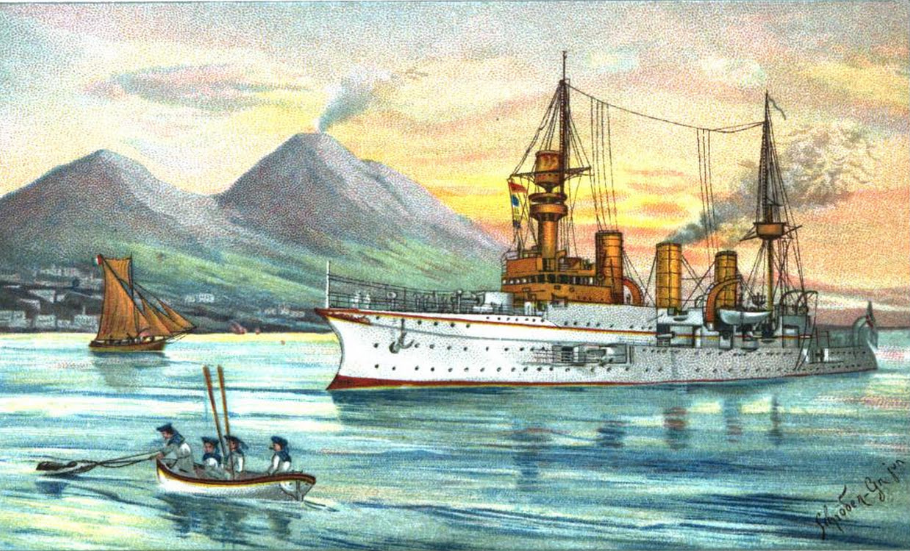
Illustration of Freya overseas, c. 1901

In the interest of developing the capabilities of the fleet's gunners, the navy established the Artillery Testing Command on 14 December 1901, and on 3 May 1902, Freya was recommissioned to join the new establishment as its core unit, replacing the ancient training ship Mars, which had been built in the 1870s. Fregattenkapitän (Frigate Captain) Hermann Jacobsen took command of the vessel at that time. She began training activities on 15 May, based in Kiel. Later that year, she was allocated to the training fleet for use as a scout for the annual large-scale maneuvers held every August and September. During the exercises, Freya suffered damage to her boilers that necessitated repairs that were completed on 15 September. The ship's boilers would prove to be a continued nuisance throughout her career, but because she was only being used for training, the navy deemed it acceptable. She thereafter resumed her gunnery training duties, along with her tender, the old armored gunboat Brummer. The two vessels accidentally collided on 13 November but suffered no significant damage. The year 1903 passed much the same as the previous one, with gunnery training interrupted only by the fleet maneuvers in August and September. On 11 January 1904, Freya was again decommissioned in Wilhelmshaven.

=== Cadet training ship ===
By this time, the naval command had decided to convert the Victoria Louise-class ships into dedicated training ships for naval cadets and apprentice seamen, as they were no longer suitable for front-line service. They would replace the old screw corvettes that had been in use for that purpose for some time and were by then badly worn out. In 1905, Freya went into drydock at the Kaiserliche Werft in Wilhelmshaven for modernization. Despite the problems with her boilers, she did not receive new models; unlike her sister ships, which had their original three funnels reduced to two, Freya kept her original funnels. The refit was finished in early 1907, and she was recommissioned on 4 April, now under the command of KzS Franz von Holleben. She completed a short trials period, operating from Wilhelmshaven and then Kiel, before embarking her first class of trainees in early May. Freya then went on a short cruise in the western Baltic Sea before participating in the Kiel Week regatta.

Freya next embarked on a major training cruise on 19 July that included visits to Norway, various ports on the Atlantic coast of Europe, and the Canary Islands before entering the Mediterranean Sea. There, Freya visited a number of cities, including Venice, Italy, Beirut in the Ottoman Empire, and Alexandria in the Khedivate of Egypt. The ship arrived back in Kiel on 18 March 1908. After embarking a new contingent of cadets and a new captain, KzS Leberecht Maass in April, Freya began the next training cruise, which started with maneuvers off Apenrade and in the North Sea, before crossing the Atlantic to visit North America. In August, Freya represented Germany at celebrations in Halifax, Canada, commemorating the 150th anniversary of the opening of the Canadian Parliament. While entering the port at around midnight on 9 August, she inadvertently rammed a schooner in heavy fog. Nine sailors were killed in the accident. Freya thereafter steamed south to visit ports in the Caribbean Sea. She arrived back in Kiel on 8 March 1909, where KzS Carl Schaumann relieved Maass.

Freya's third major cruise began on 2 June 1909, first with a visit to Norway, followed by a short return to Cuxhaven and then Wilhelmshaven, to make preparations to go abroad. From Wilhelmshaven, she got underway for the Mediterranean, stopping in Funchal in Madeira and Tenerife in the Canaries on the way. She steamed as far as the eastern Mediterranean, visiting Alexandria again, where she rendered assistance after a major fire in the city, along with ports in the Levant. Freya arrived back in Wilhelmshaven on 28 March 1910, where she went into dry dock for an overhaul that lasted until 2 May. She then moved to Kiel, where she took on another crew of cadets for a short training cruise to Norwegian waters that ended in Wilhelmshaven on 20 July.

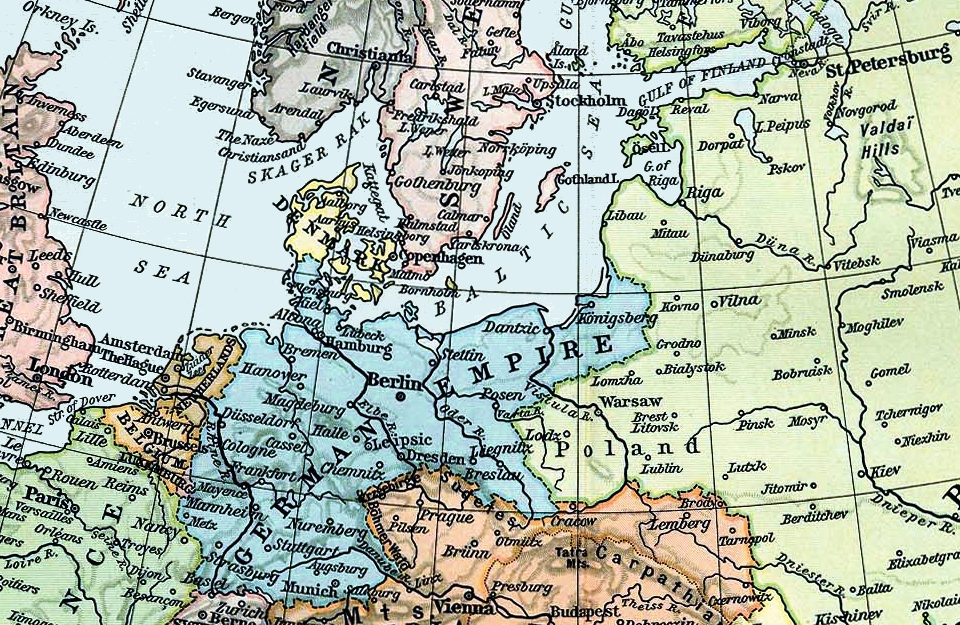
Map of the North and Baltic Seas in 1911

On 1 August 1910, Freya departed for her next major voyage overseas; unlike previous years that included numerous stops while on the way, the ship steamed directly to Mexico with a special envoy aboard. There, she met the light cruiser Bremen, which was cruising off the coast of South America. The two ships represented Germany at celebrations marking the 100th anniversary of Mexico's independence from Spain. Freya disembarked the envoy in Veracruz, Mexico, on 3 September; he went on to meet the President of Mexico. On 16 September, the ship was present for the unveiling of a monument to Alexander von Humboldt, a German explorer and geographer who had surveyed much of Mexico in 1803–1804. Kaiser Wilhelm II donated the monument to Mexico. Freya got underway on 22 September for a cruise through the Caribbean before returning home, arriving in Kiel on 13 March 1911. She then proceeded to Danzig, where she was decommissioned on 28 March for another extensive modernization. This included replacing her troublesome Niclausse boilers with modern Marine-type boilers, and her third funnel was removed at this time. After completing the work in 1913, she was assigned to the reserve fleet, remaining out of commission.

=== World War I ===
Following the outbreak of World War I in July 1914, Freya was mobilized for active service, but she was initially only activated for use as a training ship for boiler room personnel. She was briefly commanded KzS Max Schlicht from 4 to 27 August, before being replaced by Korvettenkapitän (Corvette Captain) Eduard Bartels. The ship got underway for the first time again on 7 August for initial trials; it was found that her badly fouled hull had reduced her top speed by about 1 knot (1.9 km/h; 1.2 mph), but there were no available dry docks to correct the problem. On 11 August, the ship suffered a serious accident: the inner door of one of her torpedo tubes was left open while the outer door was opened, allowing significant amounts of water to enter the ship. The forward part of the ship was flooded completely up to the level of the armor deck, leading Schlicht to decide to beach the ship to avoid sinking. Two men were killed in the accident, one of whom drowned in the torpedo room and the other a diver who attempted to close the outer door but was sucked into the tube by suction from the pumps inside. Salvage vessels assisted in recovery of the ship, and Freya was transferred into dry dock on the night of 11 August for work that lasted until 27 August; she was decommissioned the following day.

Freya was soon recommissioned on 12 September for service as a cadet training ship. Following the reestablishment of the Training Inspectorate in April 1915, which had been closed at the start of the conflict, Freya returned to her old training duties in the Baltic. At that time, she moved from Kiel to Flensburg, where she remained through the end of the war. During this period, she routinely served as a target ship for the torpedo training vessel Württemberg and various torpedo boats. She also made frequent trips to Kiel both for training purposes and for periodic maintenance. KzS Ernst-Oldwig von Natzmer took command of the vessel in April 1915, but he remained aboard only for four months, when he was replaced by KzS Wilhelm Goetze. During Natzmer's command, in July, the old aviso Grille became Freya's tender starting in July. In February and December 1916, Freya made a pair of trips into the North Sea to be dry-docked at Hamburg. She embarked on her final voyage under the Imperial Navy's ensign on 20 September 1918, sailing from Flensburg to Kiel to be dry-docked on 7 October. When work was completed on 21 November, Germany had surrendered and Imperial Germany was no more.

At some point after the war, Freya was disarmed and then towed to Hamburg, where she was used as a barracks ship for police in the city. She was stricken on 25 January 1920, but continued to serve as a barracks ship. She was ultimately broken up for scrap in Harburg in late 1921.
