= List of shipwrecks in April 1915 =

The list of shipwrecks in 1915 includes ships sunk, foundered, grounded, or otherwise lost during April 1915.

== 1 April ==
List of shipwrecks: 1 April 1915
Ship	State	Description
Gloxinia	United Kingdom	World War I: The trawler was stopped and scuttled in the North Sea 40 nautical miles (74 km; 46 mi) north east by east of the mouth of the River Tyne by SM U-10 (Imperial German Navy).
Jason	United Kingdom	World War I: The trawler was stopped and scuttled in the North Sea 40 nautical miles (74 km; 46 mi) north east by east of the mouth of the River Tyne (55°27′N 0°25′W) by SM U-10 (Imperial German Navy).
Nellie	United Kingdom	World War I: The trawler was stopped and scuttled in the North Sea 40 nautical miles (74 km; 46 mi) north east by east of the mouth of the River Tyne (55°33′N 0°19′W) by SM U-10 (Imperial German Navy).
Seven Seas	United Kingdom	World War I: The cargo ship was torpedoed and sunk in the English Channel six nautical miles (11 km; 6.9 mi) south of Beachy Head, Sussex by SM U-37 (Imperial German Navy) with the loss of nine of her seventeen crew. Survivors were rescued by a Royal Navy destroyer.

== 2 April ==
List of shipwrecks: 2 April 1915
Ship	State	Description
Greenbriar	United States	World War I: The steamer was sunk by a mine in the North Sea off Amrum, North Frisian Islands.
Lochwood	United Kingdom	World War I: The collier was torpedoed and sunk in the English Channel 25 nautical miles (46 km; 29 mi) south west of Start Point, Devon by SM U-24 (Imperial German Navy). Her crew survived.
Parquerette	France	World War I: The barquentine was scuttled in the English Channel 18 nautical miles (33 km; 21 mi) north of Cap d'Antifer, Pas-de-Calais (50°20′N 0°16′E) by SM U-33 (Imperial German Navy). Her crew survived.

== 3 April ==
List of shipwrecks: 3 April 1915
Ship	State	Description
Childwall	United Kingdom	The cargo ship collided with Trinculo (United Kingdom) in the Bristol Channel off Lundy Island, Devon and sank. Her crew were rescued by Trinculo.
Douro	Portugal	World War I: The cargo ship was reported to have been torpedoed and sunk in the Atlantic Ocean. Her crew survived.
Edward Luckenbach	United States	The tug was wrecked on a reef off False Cape, North Carolina.
Mecidiye	Ottoman Navy	World War I: The Mecidiye-class cruiser struck a mine and sank in the Gulf of Odessa. She was later salvaged by the Russians and entered service with the Imperial Russian Navy as Prut.
Unknown barges	United States	The two barges broke loose from their tow ship, Cumberland (United States), off the Cape Henlopen Light in a severe gale and heavy seas and went ashore and broke up, with the loss of ten crew.

== 4 April ==
List of shipwrecks: 4 April 1915
Ship	State	Description
City of Bremen	United Kingdom	World War I: The collier was torpedoed and sunk in the Atlantic Ocean 20 nautical miles (37 km) south by west of the Wolf Rock, Cornwall by SM U-24 (Imperial German Navy) with the loss of four of her seventeen crew. The survivors were rescued by Fanny (United Kingdom).
Flora	Netherlands	The cargo ship was driven ashore six nautical miles (11 km; 6.9 mi) west of Hartland Point, Devon, United Kingdom and was a total loss. Her crew were rescued.
Hermes	Russia	World War I: The sailing ship was sunk in the English Channel 35 nautical miles (65 km) south of St. Catherine's Point, Isle of Wight United Kingdom (50°17′N 0°55′W) by SM U-33 (Imperial German Navy).
Olivine	United Kingdom	World War I: The coaster was torpedoed and sunk in the English Channel 30 nautical miles (56 km) south of St. Catherine's Point (50°26′N 1°12′W) by SM U-33 (Imperial German Navy). Her crew survived.
Ruth	United States	The barge went ashore on Revere Beach, Boston, Massachusetts. Later salvaged.

== 5 April ==
List of shipwrecks: 5 April 1915
Ship	State	Description
Acantha	United Kingdom	World War I: The trawler was torpedoed and sunk in the North Sea 25 nautical miles (46 km; 29 mi) east by north of the Longstone Lighthouse (55°41′N 1°00′W) by SM U-10 (Imperial German Navy). Her thirteen crew were rescued by Tord (Sweden).
Coleraine	United States	The schooner barge went ashore at North Truro, Massachusetts after breaking from her tow Mars (United States). Later stripped and burned.
Manheim	United States	The schooner barge went ashore at North Truro, Massachusetts after breaking from her tow Mars (United States). Later salvaged.
Northlands	United Kingdom	World War I: The cargo ship was torpedoed and sunk in the English Channel 24 nautical miles (44 km; 28 mi) south west of Beachy Head, Sussex (50°03′N 0°16′W) by SM U-33 (Imperial German Navy). Her 24 crew were rescued by Topaz (Belgium).
SMS T57	Imperial German Navy	World War I: The S43-class torpedo boat struck a mine and sank in the Baltic Sea.
Tunnel Ridge	United States	The schooner barge went ashore at North Truro, Massachusetts after breaking from her tow Mars (United States). Later stripped and burned.

== 6 April ==
List of shipwrecks: 6 April 1915
Ship	State	Description
The Josephine	United States	The lumber schooner was wrecked off the Kill Devil Hill Coast Guard Station, North Carolina.

== 7 April ==
List of shipwrecks: 7 April 1915
Ship	State	Description
Zarina	United Kingdom	World War I: The 100.1-foot (30.5 m), 154-ton steam trawler was destroyed by an explosion, either mined, or torpedoed and sunk by a Kaiserliche Marine submarine, in the North Sea 72 nautical miles (133 km) north east by north of the Spurn Lightship (United Kingdom) with the loss of all nine of her crew.

== 8 April ==
List of shipwrecks: 8 April 1915
Ship	State	Description
Châteaubriand	France	World War I: The four-masted full-rigged ship was torpedoed and sunk in the English Channel 25 nautical miles (46 km) south east of Beachy Head, Sussex, United Kingdom by SM U-32 (Imperial German Navy). Her 25 crew survived.

== 10 April ==
List of shipwrecks: 10 April 1915
Ship	State	Description
Harpalyce	United Kingdom	World War I: The cargo ship was torpedoed and sunk in the North Sea 7 nautical miles (13 km) off the Noord Hinder Lightship (Netherlands) by SM UB-4 (Imperial German Navy) with the loss of seventeen of her 44 crew. Survivors were rescued by Elizabeth (Netherlands).
The President	United Kingdom	World War I: The coaster was stopped and scuttled in the Atlantic Ocean 14 nautical miles (26 km) south by west of The Lizard, Cornwall by SM U-24 (Imperial German Navy). Her ten crew were rescued by the fishing smack Pencaer (United Kingdom).

== 11 April ==
List of shipwrecks: 11 April 1915
Ship	State	Description
HMS Wayfarer	Royal Navy	World War I: The armed merchant cruiser was torpedoed and sunk with the loss of five of the 189 people on board.

== 12 April ==
List of shipwrecks: 12 April 1915
Ship	State	Description
Kit Carson	United States	The schooner broke up after going ashore near Narragansett Pier, Rhode Island.

== 14 April ==
List of shipwrecks: 14 April 1915
Ship	State	Description
Folke	Sweden	World War I: The cargo ship was torpedoed and sunk in the North Sea (57°55′N 0°30′E) by SM U-6 (Imperial German Navy). No casualties.
Katwijk	Netherlands	World War I: The cargo ship was sunk in the North Sea six nautical miles (11 km; 6.9 mi) west of the Noord Hinder Lightship (Netherlands) by SM UB-10 (Imperial German Navy). Her crew survived.
SMS Rubens	Imperial German Navy	Rubens after scuttling World War I: Disguised as the Danish cargo ship Kronborg, the naval transport was scuttled by her crew in shallow water in Manza Bay, German East Africa, after being shelled by HMS Hyacinth (Royal Navy).
Seminole	United States	The cargo ship ran aground and was wrecked 3 miles (4.8 km) from the entrance to Yuma Bay, Dominican Republic.
Vestland	Denmark	World War I: The cargo ship was torpedoed and sunk in the North Sea off the north east of Scotland by SM U-6 (Imperial German Navy) with the loss of all 27 crew.

== 15 April ==
List of shipwrecks: 15 April 1915
Ship	State	Description
George E. Klink	United States	The schooner went ashore on Tom Shoal, or Hawes Shoal, off Cape Poge, Martha's Vineyard, Massachusetts in heavy weather. The vessel was pulled off later that day by USCGC Acushnet ( United States Coast Guard).
Guernsey	United Kingdom	The cargo ship was wrecked near Cap de la Hague, France.
Ptarmigan	United Kingdom	World War I: The coaster was torpedoed and sunk in the North Sea 6 nautical miles (11 km) west by north of the Noordhinder Lightship (Netherlands) by SM UB-5 (Imperial German Navy) with the loss of five crew.
Roger Drury	United States	The schooner went ashore on Tom Shoal, or Hawes Shoal, off Cape Poge, Martha's Vineyard, Massachusetts in heavy weather. The vessel was pulled off on 17 April by wrecking tugs.

== 16 April ==
List of shipwrecks: 16 April 1915
Ship	State	Description
Demirhisar	Ottoman Navy	World War I: The Demirhisar-class torpedo boat was run aground and wrecked on Chios in the Aegean Sea to prevent capture by British warships.
HMS E15	Royal Navy	Wreck of HMS E15 World War I: The E-class submarine ran aground at Kepez, Çanakkale, Ottoman Empire. She was scuttled on 18 April.
Eglantine	United Kingdom	The cargo ship ran aground at Filey, Yorkshire and was a total loss. Her crew were rescued.
Manie Saunders	United States	The schooner went ashore on Fishers Island, New York. Refloated and returned to service.

== 17 April ==
List of shipwrecks: 17 April 1915
Ship	State	Description
Demir Kapı	Ottoman Navy	World War I: The torpedo boat was run ashore on Chios, Greece following a battle with Allied cruisers with the loss of one of her 34 crew. The survivors were interned on Chios.
Ellispontos	Greece	World War I: The cargo ship was sunk in the North Sea off the Noord Hinder Lightship (Netherlands) (51°52′N 3°00′E) by SM UB-4 (Imperial German Navy).

== 18 April ==
List of shipwrecks: 18 April 1915
Ship	State	Description
Vanilla	United Kingdom	World War I: The 101-foot (31 m), 158-ton steam trawler was destroyed by an explosion, either mined, or torpedoed and sunk by a Kaiserliche Marine submarine in the North Sea 53 nautical miles (98 km) east by south of the Inner Dowsing Lightship (United Kingdom) with the loss of all nine of her crew.

== 19 April ==
List of shipwrecks: 19 April 1915
Ship	State	Description
HMT Rhodesia	Royal Navy	The naval trawler was lost on this date.
Tweed	United Kingdom	The cargo ship ran aground at Sea Mills, Gloucestershire. She was refloated but then sank in the River Avon whilst being taken to Bristol.
Vanilla	United Kingdom	World War I: The trawler was reported to have been torpedoed and sunk by a German submarine with the loss of all hands.

== 20 April ==
List of shipwrecks: 20 April 1915
Ship	State	Description
Highland Queen	United States	The small schooner was lost in the Shumagin Islands in the Territory of Alaska.
Merwede	United Kingdom	The dredger sank at Rosyth, Ayrshire.

== 21 April ==
List of shipwrecks: 21 April 1915
Ship	State	Description
Ruth	Sweden	World War I: The coaster was sunk in the North Sea 100 nautical miles (190 km) east of the Isle of May, Fife, United Kingdom by SM U-22 (Imperial German Navy).
S21	Imperial German Navy	The V1-class destroyer collided with the light cruiser SMS Hamburg (Imperial German Navy) and sank in the North Sea with the loss of 36 of her crew.

== 22 April ==
List of shipwrecks: 22 April 1915
Ship	State	Description
Eva	Norway	World War I: The sailing vessel was sunk in the North Sea 170 nautical miles (310 km) north east of the Longstone Lighthouse (56°31′N 3°03′E) by SM U-38 (Imperial German Navy). Her crew survived.
Oscar	Norway	World War I: The sailing vessel was sunk in the North Sea south west of Lindesnes, Lister og Mandal county, norway (56°31′N 3°03′E) by SM U-38 (Imperial German Navy). Her crew survived.
St. Lawrence	United Kingdom	World War I: The fishing vessel was scuttled in the North Sea 88 nautical miles (163 km) east of the Spurn Lightship (United Kingdom) (54°14′N 3°02′E) by SM U-22 (Imperial German Navy) with the loss of two of her crew.

== 23 April ==
List of shipwrecks: 23 April 1915
Ship	State	Description
Fråck	Russia	World War I: The coaster was scuttled in the Baltic Sea off the Flöttjan Lighthouse (59°51′N 19°36′E) by SM U-26 (Imperial German Navy). Her crew survived.

== 26 April ==
List of shipwrecks: 26 April 1915
Ship	State	Description
Centric	Sweden	World War I: The cargo ship, en route from Immingham to Gävle, sank in the Baltic Sea after having struck a mine. No casualties.
Recolo	United Kingdom	World War I: The trawler struck a mine and sank in the North Sea 60 nautical miles (110 km) east by north of Spurn Point, Yorkshire with the loss of two of her crew. At least seven survivors were rescued by the trawler Sebastian (United Kingdom).

== 27 April ==
List of shipwrecks: 27 April 1915
Ship	State	Description
HMT Balmedie	Royal Navy	Gallipoli Campaign:The 115.35-foot (35.16 m) minesweeping naval trawler was tied up alongside Ionian (United Kingdom) and sank when her hull was slashed by Ionian's prop in the Dardanelles.
Léon Gambetta	French Navy	World War I: The Léon Gambetta-class cruiser was sunk in the Mediterranean Sea off Santa Maria di Leuca, Apulia, Italy (39°30′N 18°15′E) by SM U-4 (Austro-Hungarian Navy) with the loss of 684 of her 821 crew.

== 28 April ==
List of shipwrecks: 28 April 1915
Ship	State	Description
Fuki Maru	Japan	The cargo ship collided with Daichi Mari (Japan) in the Yellow Sea off Hichihatsuto Island, Korea and sank with the loss of 30 of her crew.
Lilydale	United Kingdom	World War I: The trawler was stopped and scuttled in the North Sea 37 nautical miles (69 km) east of St. Abb's Head, Berwickshire by SM U-10 (Imperial German Navy).
Mobile	United Kingdom	World War I: The collier was shelled and sunk in the Atlantic Ocean 25 nautical miles (46 km) north west of the Butt of Lewis, Outer Hebrides by SM U-30 (Imperial German Navy). Her crew survived.

== 29 April ==
List of shipwrecks: 29 April 1915
Ship	State	Description
HMAS AE2	Royal Australian Navy	World War I: Naval operations in the Dardanelles Campaign: The E-class submarine was scuttled in the Dardanelles following battle damage.
Cherbury	United Kingdom	World War I: The collier was scuttled in the Atlantic Ocean 27 nautical miles (50 km) west north west of Eagle Island, County Fermanagh by SM U-30 (Imperial German Navy). Her 29 crew survived.
River Clyde	United Kingdom	World War I: Naval operations in the Dardanelles Campaign: The landing ship was beached near Gallipoli, Ottoman Empire and was abandoned. She was subsequently looted by the Ottomans. Subsequently refloated; she was sold and repaired in 1920, entering Spanish service as Angela.

== 30 April ==
List of shipwrecks: 30 April 1915
Ship	State	Description
Elida	Sweden	World War I: The cargo ship was sunk in the North Sea 190 nautical miles (350 km) east of the Farne Islands, United Kingdom (56°29′N 3°16′E) by SM U-38 (Imperial German Navy). Her crew survived.
Fulgent	United Kingdom	World War I: The collier was scuttled in the Atlantic Ocean 45 nautical miles (83 km) north west of the Skellig Islands, County Kerry by SM U-30 (Imperial German Navy) with the loss of her skipper and one of her crew. Survivors were rescued 2 May by minesweeping Naval trawler HMT Angle (Royal Navy).
Laila	Norway	World War I: The coaster was sunk in the North Sea (56°51′N 3°09′E) by SM U-35 (Imperial German Navy). Her crew survived.
Svorono	Russia	World War I: The cargo ship was sunk in the Atlantic Ocean 14 nautical miles (26 km) west of the Blasket Islands, County Kerry by SM U-30 (Imperial German Navy).
SM U-37	Imperial German Navy	World War I: The Type U 31 submarine struck a mine and sank in the English Channel (51°04′N 1°48′W).

== Unknown date ==
List of shipwrecks: Unknown date 1915
Ship	State	Description
Politkofsky	United States	The cedar-hulled vessel was pounded to pieces by the surf on the beach at St. Michael, Territory of Alaska, during a storm.
