= Cipetir, Sukabumi =

Cipetir
- Village
- Location in West Java Cipetir (Indonesia)
- Coordinates: 6.8°S 107.3°E
- Country: Indonesia
- Regency: Sukabumi
- District: Kadudampit

Population (2010)
  - Total: 5,716

Cipetir (pre-EYD spelling and Dutch: Tjipetir) is a village in Sukabumi, West Java, Indonesia. As of 2010, it has 5,716 inhabitants.

The name comes from Sundanese, and literally means "Thunder River", from ci ("river") and petir ("thunder").

== Plantation ==
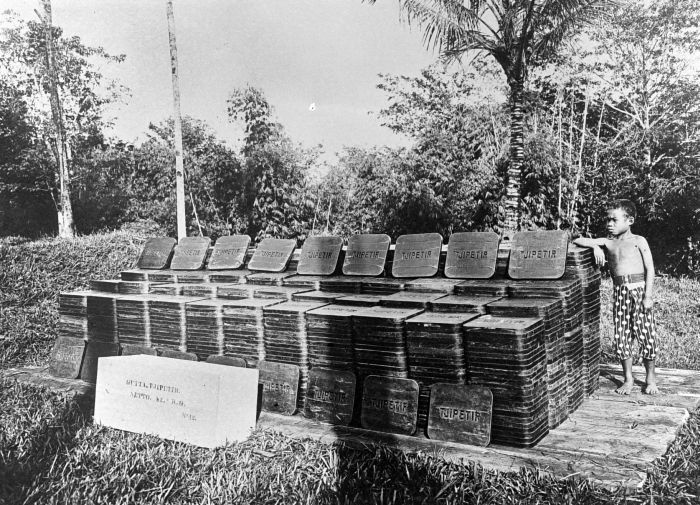
Blocks of rubber product with the TJIPETIR brand visible. Source: Tropenmuseum

Cipetir was the site of a gutta-percha plantation in the 19th and early 20th century.

Marine debris consisting of blocks of gutta-percha, which is highly resistant to water corrosion, with the word "TJIPETIR" on them has been found on beaches throughout Europe. They are believed to be coming from one or more sunken ships from the early 1900s. The wreck of the Miyazaki Maru, sank in 1917, has been put forward as potential source of the blocks.
