= Meizu U10 =

Smartphone

- Manufacturer: Meizu
- Type: Touchscreen smartphone
- Series: Meizu U Series
- First released: August 24, 2016; 9 years ago
- Compatible networks: GSM, UMTS, HSPA, LTE
- Dimensions: 141.9 mm (5.59 in) H 69.6 mm (2.74 in) W 7.9 mm (0.31 in) D
- Weight: 139 g (4.9 oz)
- Operating system: Flyme OS, based on Android 6.0 Marshmallow
- System-on-chip: MediaTek MT6750
- CPU: Octa-core (4x1.5GHz Cortex-A53, 4x1.0GHz Cortex-A53)
- GPU: ARM Mali-T860 MP2
- Memory: 2 or 3 GB LPDDR3
- Storage: 16 or 32 GB flash memory
- Removable storage: microSD slot (up to 128 GB)
- Battery: 2760 mAh Li-Ion rechargeable battery, not replaceable
- Rear camera: 13.0 MP, PDAF autofocus, ƒ/2.2 aperture, LED flash, 1080p30 recording
- Front camera: 5.0 MP, ƒ/2.0 aperture
- Display: 5-inch diagonal 720x1280 px (296 ppi)
- Connectivity: 3.5 mm TRS connector, Bluetooth 4.1 with BLE, Dual-band WiFi (802.11 a/b/g/n/ac)
- Data inputs: Multi-touch capacitive touchscreen, A-GPS, GLONASS, Accelerometer, Gyroscope, Proximity sensor, Digital compass, Ambient light sensor
- Other: Dual SIM support with dual standby mode

The Meizu U10 is a smartphone designed and produced by the Chinese manufacturer Meizu, which runs on Flyme OS, Meizu's modified Android operating system. It was introduced together with the Meizu U20 as part of the new U series of Meizu on August 24, 2016.

== Release ==
There was little information known to the public before the launch of the device on August 24, 2016. Unlike previous Meizu devices, the U series was silently launched through the official Meizu website without an actual launch event.

== Features ==
=== Flyme ===
The Meizu U10 was released with an updated version of Flyme OS, a modified operating system based on Android Marshmallow. It features an alternative, flat design and improved one-handed usability.

=== Hardware and design ===
The Meizu U10 features a MediaTek MT6750 system-on-a-chip with an array of eight ARM Cortex-A53 CPU cores, an ARM Mali-T860 MP2 GPU and 2 or 3 GB of RAM.

The U10 is available in four different colors (white, black, champagne gold and rose gold) and comes with either 2 GB of RAM and 16 GB of internal storage or with 3 GB of RAM and 32 GB of internal storage.

The Meizu U10 has a full-metal frame, while the front and the back are made out of glass. The U10 measures 141.9 mm (5.59 in) x 69.6 mm (2.74 in) x 7.9 mm (0.31 in) and weighs 139 g (4.9 oz). It has a slate form factor, being rectangular with rounded corners and has only one central physical button at the front. Unlike most other Android smartphones, the U10 doesn't have capacitive buttons nor on-screen buttons. The functionality of these keys is implemented using a technology called mBack, which makes use of gestures with the physical button. The U10 further extends this button by a fingerprint sensor called mTouch.

The U10 features a fully laminated 5-inch multi-touch capacitive touchscreen display with a HD resolution of 720 by 1280 pixels. The pixel density of the display is 296 ppi.

In addition to the touchscreen input and the front key, the device has volume/zoom control buttons and the power/lock button on the right side, a 3.5mm TRS audio jack on the top and a microUSB (Micro-B type) port on the bottom for charging and connectivity.

The Meizu U10 has two cameras. The rear camera has a resolution of 13 MP, a ƒ/2.2 aperture, a 5-element lens, phase-detection autofocus and an LED flash. The front camera has a resolution of 5 MP, a ƒ/2.0 aperture and a 4-element lens.

== See also ==
- Meizu
- Meizu U20
