= U11 (Berlin U-Bahn) =

New U bahn in berlin

Overview
- Status: Cancelled
- Locale: Berlin
- Termini: Glambecker Ring; Hauptbahnhof
- Stations: 21

Service
- Type: Rapid transit
- System: Berlin U-Bahn
- Operator(s): Berliner Verkehrsbetriebe
- Depot(s): Weißensee

Technical
- Track gauge: 1,435 mm (4 ft 8 1/2 in) standard gauge
- Loading gauge: Großprofil

The U11 line is a cancelled line of the Berlin U-Bahn.

It was featured in the Berlin city transport development plan (StEP) in 1995 and the zoning of 2004 and 2009 as a route control system.

Several tram lines are already running to the parallel route (M5, M6, M8, 16) and the plans were cancelled. In March 2023, an internal document revealed that the BVG (Berlin Transport Authority) was considering the previously planned route as part of a potential expansion of the U4 subway line as part of its future planning initiative BVG 2050+ (working title: Express Metropolis Berlin). According to this document, the U4 would initially be extended from Nollendorfplatz to the main train station, from where it would then continue along the previously planned route of the U11. However, according to the coalition agreement between the CDU and SPD following the 2023 Berlin state elections, only the section from Alexanderplatz to Marzahn would be examined in more detail initially (in parallel with potential projects such as the U10, etc.).

The U11 would connect the eastern districts of Berlin to Berlin Hauptbahnhof. It would comprise extend 15.8 kilometers, with 21 stations, which are:

1. Berlin Hauptbahnhof (ICE, IC, RB, RE, InterConnex, Harz-Berlin-Express, S5, S7, S75, U55)
2. Naturkundemuseum (U6)
3. Berlin Nordbahnhof (S1, S2, S25)
4. Rosenthaler Platz (U8)
5. Rosa-Luxemburg-Platz (U2)
6. Mollstraße
7. Platz der Vereinten Nationen
8. Langenbeckstraße
9. Landsberger Allee (S41, S42, S8, S85)
10. Franz-Jacob-Straße
11. Weißenseer Weg
12. Vulkanstraße
13. Genslerstraße
14. Arendsweg
15. Rhinstraße
16. Bürknersfelde (possible transition to the S-Bahn)
17. Marzahn (S7)
18. Marzahner Promenade
19. Allee der Kosmonauten
20. Ringenwalder Straße
21. Glambecker Ring.
