= SM U-10 (Germany) =

Coordinates: 59°30′N 21°00′E

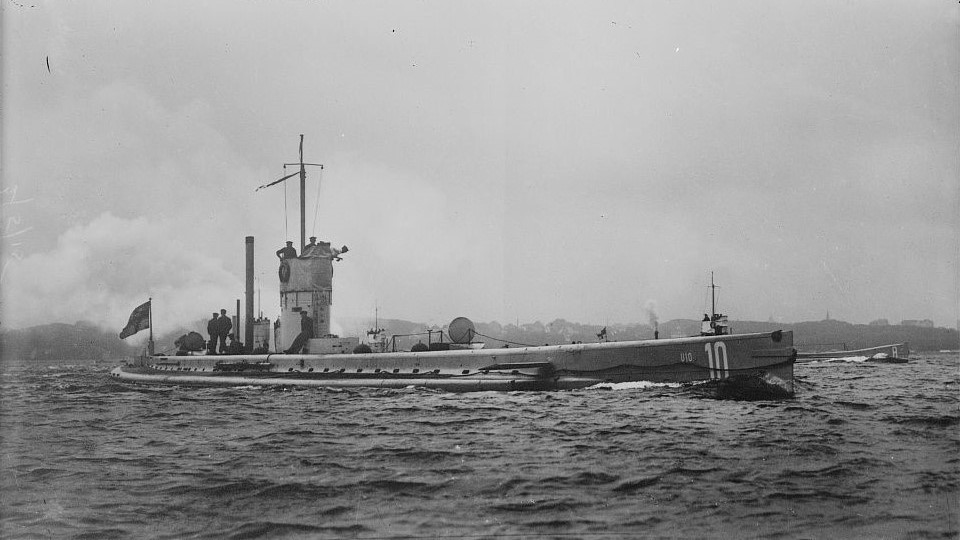
- U-10

History

German Empire
- Name: U-10
- Ordered: 15 July 1908
- Builder: Kaiserliche Werft Danzig
- Cost: 2,140,000 Goldmark
- Yard number: 5
- Launched: 24 January 1911
- Commissioned: 31 August 1911
- Fate: Missing in the Baltic Sea since June 1916

General characteristics
- Class & type: Type U 9 submarine
- Displacement: 493 t (485 long tons) surfaced; 611 t (601 long tons) submerged
- Length: 57.38 m (188 ft 3 in) o/a
- Beam: 6 m (19 ft 8 in)
- Draught: 3.13 m (10 ft 3 in)
- Installed power: 2 × Körting 6-cylinder and 2 × Körting 8-cylinder two stroke paraffin motors with 900 PS (660 kW; 890 shp); 2 × SSW electric motors with 1,040 PS (760 kW; 1,030 shp); 550 rpm surfaced; 600 rpm submerged
- Propulsion: 2 shafts; 2 × 1.30 m (4 ft 3 in) propellers
- Speed: 14.2 knots (26.3 km/h; 16.3 mph) surfaced; 8.1 knots (15.0 km/h; 9.3 mph) submerged
- Range: 3,250 nmi (6,020 km; 3,740 mi) at 9 knots (17 km/h; 10 mph)
- Test depth: 50 m (160 ft)
- Boats & landing craft carried: 1 dinghy
- Complement: 4 officers, 25 men
- Armament: 4 × torpedo tubes (two bow, two stern); 6 45 cm (17.7 in) torpedoes; 1 × 3.7 cm (1.5 in) Hotchkiss gun

Service record
- Part of: I Flotilla; 1 August 1914 – 7 July 1915; Baltic Flotilla; 7 July 1915 – 1 June 1916
- Commanders: Kptlt. Fritz Stuhr; 1 August 1914 – 1 June 1916
- Operations: 6 patrols
- Victories: 7 merchant ships sunk (1,651 GRT)

SM U-10 (Note: "SM" stands for "Seiner Majestät" (English: His Majesty's) and combined with the U for Unterseeboot would be translated as His Majesty's Submarine.) was one of 329 submarines which served in the Imperial German Navy during World War I. The boat was one of four Type U 9 submarines which were built for the Navy. It sunk seven ships during the war before being lost in the Baltic Sea in 1916.

== Service history ==
U-10 was built at Kaiserliche Werft Danzig between 1908 and 1911. It was launched on 24 January 1911 and commissioned in August of the same year. At the start of World War I the boat was commanded by Kapitänleutnant Fritz Stuhr.

Stuhr commanded U-10 throughout its career, sinking six ships in the North Sea during 1915. The boat later moved to the Baltic Sea where it sank one more ship, the Finnish steamer Birgit in November 1915.

On 27 May 1916 U-10 left Libau (now Liepāja) in Latvia to operate off the Swedish coast on a patrol scheduled to last eight days. She was not heard from again and was presumed lost with all 29 on board. The exact time, place and circumstances of her loss remain unknown.

== Summary of raiding history ==
U-10 sank seven merchant ships. The combined tonnage of the vessels was 1,651 GRT.

| Date | Ship name | Nationality | Tonnage (Note: Tonnages are in gross register tons.) | Fate |
|---|---|---|---|---|
| 31 March 1915 | Nor | Norway | 544 | Sunk |
| 1 April 1915 | Gloxinia | United Kingdom | 145 | Sunk |
| 1 April 1915 | Jason | United Kingdom | 176 | Sunk |
| 1 April 1915 | Nellie | United Kingdom | 109 | Sunk |
| 5 April 1915 | Acantha | United Kingdom | 322 | Sunk |
| 28 April 1915 | Lilydale | United Kingdom | 129 | Sunk |
| 6 November 1915 | Birgit | Finland | 226 | Sunk |

== Bibliography ==
- Gröner, Erich; Jung, Dieter; Maass, Martin (1991). U-boats and Mine Warfare Vessels. German Warships 1815–1945. Vol. 2. Translated by Thomas, Keith; Magowan, Rachel. London: Conway Maritime Press. ISBN 0-85177-593-4.
- Rössler, Eberhard (1985). Die deutschen U-Boote und ihre Werften: U-Bootbau bis Ende des 1. Weltkriegs, Konstruktionen für das Ausland und die Jahre 1935–1945 [The German Submarines and Their Shipyards: Submarine Construction Until the End of the First World War] (in German). Vol. I. Koblenz: Bernard & Graefe. ISBN 3-7637-5213-7.
