= Miyazaki Maru =

Miyazaki Maru (宮崎丸) was an 8,520-ton Japanese ocean liner built in 1909 by Kawasaki Dockyard Co., Ltd. in Kobe. While steaming from Yokohama, Japan, to London during World War I, she was sunk in the Atlantic Ocean 150 miles (240 km) to the west of the Isles of Scilly on 31 May 1917 by the Imperial German Navy submarine U-88, with the loss of eight lives.

Miyazaki Maru has been cited as a possible source of the 100-year-old gutta-percha blocks from Indonesia inscribed with the name "Tjipetir" that began to wash up on the coasts of Western Europe in summer 2012.
