= Kaiserliche Werft Danzig =

German shipbuilding company

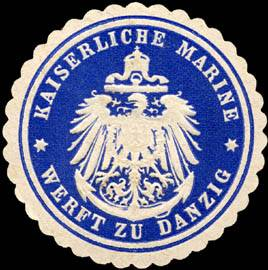
- Industry: Shipbuilding
- Founded: 1871
- Defunct: 1918
- Fate: Closed after World War I
- Successor: Danziger Werft
- Headquarters: Danzig, German Empire
- Products: Warships; U-boats

Kaiserliche Werft Danzig was a German shipbuilding company founded in 1852 as Königliche Werft Danzig and renamed Kaiserliche Werft after the proclamation of the German Empire in 1871. Together with Kaiserliche Werft Kiel and Kaiserliche Werft Wilhelmshaven it was one of three shipyards responsible for maintenance, repair and construction of warships for the Imperial German Navy. Kaiserliche Werft Danzig closed in 1918 after the end of World War I, but soon opened when Danziger Werft was founded on its site in 1919.

== History ==
The history of the Danzig shipyard started 1844 when some area on both sides of the river Tote Weichsel at Danzig became property of the Royal Prussian Government. Named Marinedepot (1849–54) it was first only used as a depot and anchoring space for the few Prussian warships at the time. At the end of 1853 it became Königliche Werft Danzig (1854 – 1871), and was subsequently named Kaiserliche Werft Danzig (1871 – 1918) with the proclamation of the German Empire in 1871.

In 1848 when Prussia started to enlarge its navy, own development and construction of warships got higher priority which required greater shipyards for these means. In 1850 additional new grounds were bought, further constructions followed and in the late 1870s once more there was a large extension of the facilities.

However, the disadvantage of the KWD was the narrow channel of the river (Weichsel) as well as some restrictions imposed by the Danzig municipality. This limited, of course, both the quantity and the dimensions of the built. The delivered tonnage of the KWD was only about 60% of that of Imperial Kiel Shipyard (Kaiserliche Werft Kiel) and only 40% of that of the Imperial Wilhelmshaven Shipyard (Kaiserliche Werft Wilhelmshaven) in the period 1898 to 1904. The construction of larger warships ended consequently 1909 with the commissioning of the light cruiser Emden. After that time the KWD concentrated the activities on the construction of auxiliary ships and later on submarines/u boats as well as maintenance and repair of warships.

Beginning in 1908 parts of the yard were enlarged and more buildings rose on these grounds for U-boat construction. The KWD was the only of the three imperial shipyards which built U-boats for the Kaiserliche Marine. Beginning with U-2 in 1906–1908 altogether 62 boats were built, but only 44 between 1914 and 1918, which was about 12% of total German submarine production, few compared to privately owned German shipyards at that time.

With end of World War I the shipyard was closed but soon after opened again under different names and with different owners. Merged with the former Schichau-Werft Danzig, it belongs to Poland today, named Stocznia Gdańsk Spółka Akcyjna resp. in German Werft Danzig AG (since 1990).

=== Ships built by Kaiserliche Werft Danzig (selection) ===
- 1871, Gun boat Albatross
- 1872, Corvette Ariadne
- 1875, Armoured corvette Hansa
- 1877, Corvette Gneisenau
- 1896, Armoured ship Odin, first Odin-class coastal defense ship, total two units
- 1890, Unprotected cruiser Bussard, first of six equal type ships
- 1899, Protected cruisers Freya und Vineta
- 1906, Light cruiser Stuttgart
- 1908, Light cruiser Emden
- 1908 – 1918, total 46 U-boats of different types completed, additional 27 planned but not completed
  - SM U-2
  - Type U-3: SM U-3, SM U-4
  - Type U-9: SM U-9, SM U-10, SM U-11, SM U-12
  - Type U-13: SM U-13, SM U-14, SM U-15
  - Type U-17: SM U-17, SM U-18
  - Type U-19: SM U-19, SM U-20, SM U-21, SM U-22
  - Type U 27: SM U-27, SM U-28, SM U-29, SM U-30
  - Type U 43: SM U-43, SM U-44, SM U-45, SM U-46, SM U-47, SM U-48, SM U-49, SM U-50
  - Type UE 1: SM U-73, SM U-74
  - Type U 87: SM U-87, SM U-88, SM U-89, SM U-90, SM U-91, SM U-92
  - Type U-127: SM U-135, SM U-136, SM U-137, SM U-138
  - Type UC II: SM UC-55, SM UC-56, SM UC-57, SM UC-58, SM UC-59, SM UC-60
  - Type UC III: UC 80 - UC 86, UC 139- UC 152 (never completed)
  - Type U 213: U 213-218 (never completed)

=== Aircraft ===
- Kaiserliche Werft Danzig 404
- Kaiserliche Werft Danzig 467
- Kaiserliche Werft Danzig 1105
- Kaiserliche Werft Danzig 1650
