= SM U-138 =

History

German Empire
- Name: U-138
- Ordered: 27 May 1916
- Builder: Kaiserliche Werft Danzig
- Launched: 12 January 1917
- Commissioned: 26 March 1918
- Fate: Unknown

General characteristics
- Class & type: Type Large MS submarine
- Displacement: 1,175 t (1,156 long tons) surfaced; 1,534 t (1,510 long tons) submerged
- Length: 83.50 m (273 ft 11 in) o/a; 65.75 m (215 ft 9 in) pressure hull
- Beam: 7.54 m (24 ft 9 in) o/a; 4.85 m (15 ft 11 in) pressure hull
- Height: 9.46 m (31 ft)
- Draught: 4.26 m (14 ft)
- Installed power: 2 × MAN diesel engines, 3,400 bhp (2,500 kW) total; 2 × diesel generators for surface dash, 890 brake horsepower (660 kW) total; 2 × electric motors, 1,670 shp (1,240 kW) total
- Propulsion: 2 × propeller shafts
- Speed: 17 knots (31 km/h; 20 mph) surfaced; 9.1 knots (16.9 km/h; 10.5 mph) submerged
- Range: 10,000 nmi (19,000 km; 12,000 mi) at 8 knots (15 km/h; 9.2 mph) surfaced; 50 nmi (93 km; 58 mi) at 4.5 knots (8.3 km/h; 5.2 mph) submerged
- Test depth: 75 m (246 ft)
- Complement: 44 men
- Armament: 6 × torpedo tubes (4 bow, 2 stern); 16 × torpedoes; 1 × 15 cm (5.9 in) SK L/45 deck gun with 220 rounds; 1 × 8.8 cm (3.5 in) SK L/30 deck gun

Service record
- Operations: None
- Victories: None

SM U-138 (Note: "SM" stands for "Seiner Majestät" (English: His Majesty's) and combined with the U for Unterseeboot would be translated as His Majesty's Submarine.) was one of the 329 submarines serving in the Imperial German Navy in World War I. U-138 was engaged in the naval warfare and took part in the First Battle of the Atlantic.

== Bibliography ==
- Gröner, Erich; Jung, Dieter; Maass, Martin (1991). U-boats and Mine Warfare Vessels. German Warships 1815–1945. Vol. 2. Translated by Thomas, Keith; Magowan, Rachel. London: Conway Maritime Press. ISBN 0-85177-593-4.
