= SM U-11 (Germany) =

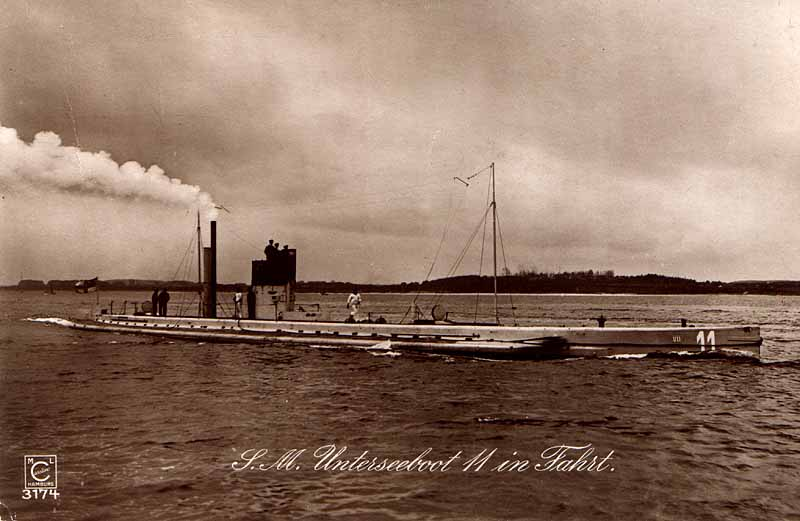

History

German Empire
- Name: U-11
- Ordered: 15 July 1908
- Builder: Kaiserliche Werft Danzig
- Cost: 2,140,000 Goldmark
- Yard number: 6
- Launched: 2 April 1910
- Commissioned: 21 September 1910
- Fate: 9 December 1914 - Mined off the Belgian coast on 9 December 1914 at position 51°06′N 1°29′E

General characteristics
- Class & type: Type U 9 submarine
- Displacement: 493 t (485 long tons) surfaced; 611 t (601 long tons) submerged
- Length: 57.38 m (188 ft 3 in) (o/a)
- Beam: 6 m (19 ft 8 in)
- Draught: 3.13 m (10 ft 3 in)
- Installed power: 2 × Körting 6-cylinder and 2 × Körting 8-cylinder two stroke paraffin motors with 900 PS (660 kW; 890 shp); 2 × SSW electric motors and 2 × SSW modyns with 1,160 PS (850 kW; 1,140 shp); 550 rpm surfaced; 600 rpm submerged
- Propulsion: 2 shafts, 2 × 1.45 m (4 ft 9 in) propellers
- Speed: 14.2 knots (26.3 km/h; 16.3 mph) surfaced; 8.1 knots (15.0 km/h; 9.3 mph) submerged
- Range: 1,800 nmi (3,300 km; 2,100 mi) at 14 knots (26 km/h; 16 mph)
- Test depth: 50 m (160 ft)
- Complement: 4 officers, 25 men
- Armament: 4 × 45 cm (17.7 in) torpedo tubes (two bow, two stern, six torpedoes)

Service record
- Part of: I Flotilla; 1 August – 9 December 1914
- Commanders: Kptlt. Ferdinand von Suchodoletz; 1 August 1914 – 9 December 1914
- Operations: 2 patrols
- Victories: None

SM U-11 (Note: "SM" stands for "Seiner Majestät" (English: His Majesty's) and combined with the U for Unterseeboot would be translated as His Majesty's Submarine.) was one of 329 submarines which served in the Imperial German Navy during World War I. The boat was sunk in December 1914 after hitting a naval mine off the coast of Belgium.

== Service history ==
U-11 was built at Kaiserliche Werft Danzig between 1908 and 1910. It was launched in April 1910 and commissioned into the Navy later in the year. At the start of World War I it was commanded by Kapitänleutnant Ferdinand von Suchodoletz.

During the war U-11 took part in two war patrols. The boat was sunk on 9 December 1914 off the Belgium coast after striking a mine. It did not sink any merchant shipping during its career.

== Bibliography ==
- Gröner, Erich; Jung, Dieter; Maass, Martin (1991). U-boats and Mine Warfare Vessels. German Warships 1815–1945. Vol. 2. Translated by Thomas, Keith; Magowan, Rachel. London: Conway Maritime Press. ISBN 0-85177-593-4.
- Rössler, Eberhard (1985). Die deutschen U-Boote und ihre Werften: U-Bootbau bis Ende des 1. Weltkriegs, Konstruktionen für das Ausland und die Jahre 1935–1945 [The German Submarines and Their Shipyards: Submarine Construction Until the End of the First World War] (in German). Vol. I. Koblenz: Bernard & Graefe. ISBN 3-7637-5213-7.
- Kemp, Paul (1997). U-boats destroyed, German submarine losses in the World Wars. London: Arms & Armour Press. p. 9. ISBN 1-85409-321-5.
