= Type U 9 submarine =

German pre-World War I submarine class

Class overview
- Builders: Kaiserliche Werft Danzig
- Operators: Imperial German Navy
- Preceded by: Type U 5
- Succeeded by: Type U 13
- Completed: 4
- Lost: 3

General characteristics
- Displacement: 493 tonnes (485 long tons) surfaced; 611 tonnes (601 long tons) submerged
- Length: 57.38 m (188 ft 3 in) (o/a); 48 m (157 ft 6 in) (pressure hull)
- Beam: 6 m (19 ft 8 in) (o/a); 3.65 m (12 ft) (pressure hull)
- Height: 7.05 m (23 ft 2 in)
- Draught: 3.13 m (10 ft 3 in)
- Installed power: 2 × Körting 6-cylinder and 2 × Körting 8-cylinder two stroke paraffin motors with a total of 1,000 PS (740 kW; 990 shp); 2 × SSW electric motors with 1,160 PS (850 kW; 1,140 shp); 550 rpm surfaced; 460 rpm submerged
- Propulsion: 2 shafts; 2 × 1.45 m (4 ft 9 in) propellers
- Speed: 14.2 knots (26.3 km/h; 16.3 mph) surfaced; 8.1 knots (15.0 km/h; 9.3 mph) submerged
- Range: 1,800 nmi (3,300 km; 2,100 mi) at 14 knots (26 km/h; 16 mph); 80 nmi (150 km; 92 mi) at 5 knots (9.3 km/h; 5.8 mph)
- Complement: 4 officers, 25 enlisted
- Armament: four 45 cm (17.7 in) torpedo tubes (2 each bow and stern); 6 torpedoes; 1 × 3.7 cm (1.5 in) Hotchkiss gun; 1 × 5 cm (2 in) SK L/40 gun (from 1915); 1 × machine gun

Type U 9 was a class of four gasoline-powered U-boats built between 1908 and 1911 for the Imperial German Navy. The boats were commissioned in 1911 and 1912 and saw service during World War I. Three of the boats were lost during the war, with one, SM U-9, surviving to surrender in 1918.

== Design ==
Type U 9s had an overall length of 57.38 m (188 ft 3 in) The boats' beam was 6.00 m (19 ft 8 in), the draught was 3.65 m (12 ft 0 in). The boats displaced 493 tonnes (485 long tons) when surfaced and 611 t (601 long tons) when submerged.

Type U 9s were fitted with two Körting 6-cylinder and two 8-cylinder two-stroke paraffin engines with a total of 1,000 metric horsepower (735 kW; 986 bhp) for use on the surface and two SSW double-acting electric motors with a total of 860 kW (1,169 PS; 1,153 shp) for underwater use. These engines powered two shafts, which gave the boats a top surface speed of 14.2 knots (26.3 km/h; 16.3 mph), and 8.1 knots (15.0 km/h; 9.3 mph) when submerged. Cruising range was 3,250 nautical miles (6,020 km; 3,740 mi) at 9 knots (17 km/h; 10 mph) on the surface and 80 nautical miles (150 km; 92 mi) at 5 knots (9.3 km/h; 5.8 mph) submerged. Constructional diving depth (Note: Constructional diving depth had a safety factor of 2.5, which meant that crushing depth was 2.5 times construction diving depth.) was 50 m (164 ft 1 in).

The U-boats were armed with four 45 cm (18 in) torpedo tubes, two fitted in the bow and two in the stern, and carried six torpedoes. The boats' complement was 4 officers and 25 enlisted.

== List of Type U 9 boats ==
All four Type U 9 boats were built at Kaiserliche Werft Danzig.

| Name | Launched | Commissioned | Merchant ships sunk (GRT) | Warships sunk (tons) | Fate |
|---|---|---|---|---|---|
| U-9 | 22 Feb 1910 | 18 Apr 1910 | 14 (8,636) | 5 (44,715) | Surrendered 26 November 1918 at Dover. Scrapped at Morecambe in 1919. |
| U-10 | 24 Jan 1911 | 31 Aug 1911 | 7 (1,651) | None | Lost after 27 May 1916 in the Gulf of Finland. |
| U-11 | 2 Apr 1910 | 21 Sep 1910 | None | None | Sunk on 9 December 1914 after hitting a mine off the coast of Belgium in the southern North Sea. |
| U-12 | 6 May 1910 | 13 Aug 1911 | 1 (1,005) | 1 (810) | Sunk on 10 March 1915 in the North Sea. |

== Bibliography ==
- Herzog, Bodo (1993). Deutsche U-Boote: 1906−1966 [German U-boats: 1906−1966] (in German). Erlangen: Müller. ISBN 978-3-86-070036-5.
- Möller, Eberhard; Brack, Werner (2004). The Encyclopedia of U-Boats. London: Chatham. ISBN 1-85367-623-3.
- Rössler, Eberhard (1981). The U-boat: The Evolution and Technical History of German submarines. London: Cassell. ISBN 0-304-36120-8.
