= Small nucleolar RNA SNORD20 =

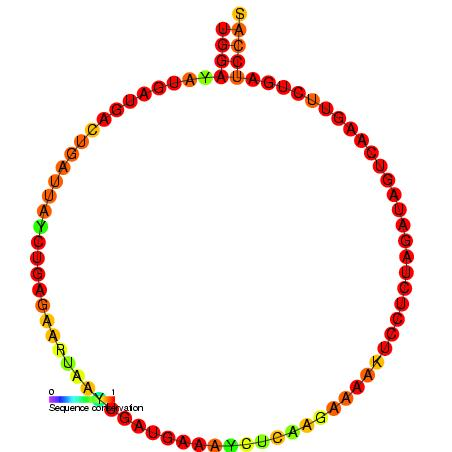
- Predicted secondary structure and sequence conservation of SNORD20

Identifiers
- Symbol: SNORD20
- Alt. Symbols: U20
- Rfam: RF00217

Other data
- RNA type: Gene; snRNA; snoRNA; C/D-box
- Domain: Eukaryota
- GO: GO:0006396 GO:0005730
- SO: SO:0000593
- PDB structures: PDBe

In molecular biology, snoRNA U20 (also known as SNORD20) is a non-coding RNA (ncRNA) molecule which functions in the modification of other small nuclear RNAs (snRNAs). This type of modifying RNA is usually located in the nucleolus of the eukaryotic cell which is a major site of snRNA biogenesis. It is known as a small nucleolar RNA (snoRNA) and also often referred to as a guide RNA.

snoRNA U20 belongs to the C/D box class of snoRNAs which contain the conserved sequence motifs known as the C box (UGAUGA) and the D box (CUGA). Most of the members of the box C/D family function in directing site-specific 2'-O-methylation of substrate RNAs.

U20 is encoded in intron 11 of the nucleolin gene in human, mouse and rat. It is predicted to guide the 2'O-ribose methylation of 18S ribosomal RNA (rRNA) residue U1804.
