= SM U-132 =

History

German Empire
- Name: U-132
- Ordered: 27 May 1916
- Builder: AG Weser, Bremen
- Yard number: 273
- Fate: unfinished at the end of war; broken up, 1919–20

General characteristics
- Class & type: Type U 127
- Displacement: 1,160 t (1,140 long tons), surfaced; 1,527 t (1,503 long tons), submerged
- Length: 82.50 m (270 ft 8 in) (o/a); 65.15 m (213 ft 9 in) (pressure hull)
- Beam: 7.54 m (24 ft 9 in)
- Draft: 4.16 m (13 ft 8 in)
- Propulsion: 2 × propeller shafts; 2 × MAN diesel engines, 3,500 bhp (2,600 kW) total; 2 × diesel generators for surface dash, 890 brake horsepower (660 kW) total; 2 × electric motors, 1,670 shp (1,240 kW) total
- Speed: 17 knots (31 km/h; 20 mph), surfaced; 8.1 knots (15.0 km/h; 9.3 mph), submerged
- Range: 10,000 nmi (19,000 km; 12,000 mi) at 8 knots (15 km/h; 9.2 mph); 50 nmi (93 km; 58 mi) at 4.5 knots (8.3 km/h; 5.2 mph)
- Test depth: 75 metres (246 ft)
- Complement: 46
- Armament: 6 × 50 cm (19.7 in) torpedo tubes (4 bow, 2 stern); 14 × torpedoes; 2 × 10.5 cm (4.1 in) deck gun
- Notes: 30-second diving time

SM U-132 was a German Type U 127 submarine or U-boat in the German Imperial Navy (German: Kaiserliche Marine) during World War I. The U-boat was ordered on 27 May 1916 and laid down sometime after that. At the end of World War I, the submarine was only 80 to 90% complete; had she been completed and commissioned into the German Imperial Navy she would have been known as SM U-132. (Note: "SM" stands for "Seiner Majestät" (English: His Majesty's) and combined with the U for Unterseeboot would be translated as His Majesty's Submarine.) U-132 was broken up in place between 1919 and 1920.

== Bibliography ==
- Gröner, Erich; Jung, Dieter; Maass, Martin (1991). U-boats and Mine Warfare Vessels. German Warships 1815–1945. Vol. 2. Translated by Thomas, Keith; Magowan, Rachel. London: Conway Maritime Press. ISBN 0-85177-593-4.
- Gardiner, Robert; Gray, Randal, eds. (1985). Conway's All the World's Fighting Ships 1906–1921. Annapolis, Maryland: Naval Institute Press. ISBN 978-0-87021-907-8. OCLC 12119866.
- Tarrant, V. E. (1989). The U-Boat Offensive: 1914–1945. Annapolis, Maryland: Naval Institute Press. ISBN 978-0-87021-764-7. OCLC 20338385.
