= SM U-15 (Germany) =

U-boat submarine (destroyed)

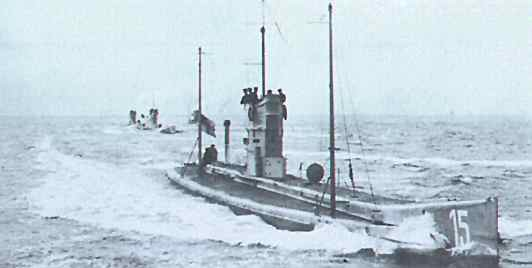
- U 15 underway

History

Germany
- Name: U-15
- Ordered: 23 February 1909
- Builder: Kaiserliche Werft Danzig
- Cost: 2,101,000 Goldmark
- Yard number: 10
- Launched: 18 September 1911
- Commissioned: 7 July 1912
- Fate: Rammed and sunk 9 August 1914

General characteristics
- Class & type: Type U 13 submarine
- Displacement: 516 t (508 long tons) surfaced; 644 t (634 long tons) submerged
- Length: 57.88 m (189 ft 11 in)
- Beam: 6 m (19 ft 8 in)
- Draught: 3.44 m (11 ft 3 in)
- Propulsion: 2 shafts; 2 × Körting 6-cylinder and 2 × Körting 8-cylinder two stroke paraffin motors with 900 PS (660 kW; 890 shp); 2 × SSW electric motors with 1,040 PS (760 kW; 1,030 shp); 550 rpm surfaced; 600 rpm submerged
- Speed: 14.8 knots (27.4 km/h; 17.0 mph) surfaced; 10.7 knots (19.8 km/h; 12.3 mph) submerged
- Range: 2,000 nautical miles (3,700 km; 2,300 mi) at 14 kn
- Test depth: 50 m (160 ft)
- Boats & landing craft carried: 1 dinghy
- Complement: 4 officers, 25 men
- Armament: 4 × 45 cm (17.7 in) torpedo tubes (2 each bow and stern) with 6 torpedoes

Service record
- Part of: II Flotilla; 1–9 August 1914
- Commanders: Kptlt. Richard Pohle; 1–9 August 1914
- Operations: 1 patrol
- Victories: None

SM U-15 (Note: "SM" stands for "Seiner Majestät" (English: His Majesty's) and combined with the U for Unterseeboot would be translated as His Majesty's Submarine.) was one of the three Type U 13 gasoline-powered U-boats produced by the German Empire for the Imperial German Navy. On 9 August 1914, U-15 became the first U-boat lost to an enemy warship after it was rammed by British light cruiser HMS Birmingham in the North Sea.

== Service history ==
Constructed by Kaiserliche Werft Danzig, U-15 was ordered on 23 February 1909 and commissioned three years later on 7 July 1912. At the start of World War I the boat was commanded by Kapitänleutnant Richard Pohle. The boat left port for its first patrol on 1 August 1914, part of a group of U-boats tasked with attacking the British naval base at Scapa Flow.

On 9 August, U-15 was forced to lie stopped on the surface off the coast of Fair Isle, in Shetland, after its engines failed. Whilst it was stranded on the surface in thick fog, the British cruiser HMS Birmingham was alerted to the boat after hearing hammering, presumed to be an attempt to repair U-15's engines. Birmingham's Captain Arthur Duff ordered his crew to fire on the U-boat, but missed. As U-15 attempted to dive to avoid the attack, Duff ordered his ship to ram the submarine at full speed, cutting it in half and sinking it at 58°22′N 0°58′E. All 25 members of the submarine's crew were killed.
