= Type U 13 submarine =

German pre-World War I submarine class

Class overview
- Builders: Kaiserliche Werft Danzig
- Operators: Imperial German Navy
- Preceded by: Type U 9
- Succeeded by: U-16
- Completed: 3
- Lost: 3

General characteristics
- Type: Submarine
- Displacement: 516 t (508 long tons) surfaced; 644 t (634 long tons) submerged
- Length: 57.88 m (189 ft 11 in)
- Beam: 6 m (19 ft 8 in)
- Draught: 3.44 m (11 ft 3 in)
- Propulsion: 2 shafts; 2 × Körting 6-cylinder and 2 × Körting 8-cylinder two stroke paraffin motors with 900 PS (660 kW; 890 shp); 2 × SSW electric motors with 1,040 PS (760 kW; 1,030 shp)
- Speed: 14.8 knots (27.4 km/h; 17.0 mph) surfaced; 10.7 knots (19.8 km/h; 12.3 mph) submerged
- Range: 2,000 nmi (3,700 km; 2,300 mi) at 14 kn surfaced; 90 nmi (170 km; 100 mi) at 5 kn submerged
- Test depth: 50 m (160 ft)
- Complement: 4 officers, 25 men
- Armament: 4 × 45 cm (17.7 in) torpedo tubes (2 each bow and stern) with 6 torpedoes

Type U 13 was a class of three gasoline powered U-boats used during World War I by the Imperial German Navy. The boats were built between 1909 and 1911 and commissioned into the Navy during 1912. Each of the three boats was lost during the first year of the war.

== Design ==
Type U 13s had an overall length of 57.88 m (189 ft 11 in) The boats' beam was 6.00 m (19 ft 8 in), the draught was 3.44 m (11 ft 3 in). The boats displaced 516 tonnes (508 long tons) when surfaced and 644 t (634 long tons) when submerged.

Type U 13s were fitted with two Körting 6-cylinder and two 8-cylinder two-stroke paraffin engines with a total of 1,200 metric horsepower (883 kW; 1,184 bhp) for use on the surface and two SSW double-acting electric motors with a total of 760 kW (1,033 PS; 1,019 shp) for underwater use. These engines powered two shafts, which gave the boats a top surface speed of 14.8 knots (27.4 km/h; 17.0 mph), and 10.7 knots (19.8 km/h; 12.3 mph) when submerged. Cruising range was 4,000 nautical miles (7,400 km; 4,600 mi) at 9 knots (17 km/h; 10 mph) on the surface and 90 nautical miles (170 km; 100 mi) at 5 knots (9.3 km/h; 5.8 mph) submerged. Constructional diving depth (Note: Constructional diving depth had a safety factor of 2.5, which meant that crushing depth was 2.5 times construction diving depth.) was 50 m (164 ft 1 in).

The U-boats were armed with four 45 cm (18 in) torpedo tubes, two fitted in the bow and two in the stern, and carried six torpedoes. The boats' complement was 4 officers and 25 enlisted.

== List of Type U 13 boats ==
All three Type U 13 boats were built at Kaiserliche Werft Danzig between 1909 and 1911.

Name	Launched	Commissioned	Ships sunk	Fate
U-13	16 December 1910	25 April 1912	None	Lost between 6 and 12 August 1914 in the North Sea
U-14	11 July 1911	24 April 1912	2 (3,907 GRT)	Sunk on 5 June 1915 in the North Sea
U-15	18 September 1911	7 July 1912	None	Sunk on 9 August 1914 in the North Sea

== Bibliography ==
- Herzog, Bodo (1993). Deutsche U-Boote : 1906 - 1966 [German U-boats : 1906 - 1966] (in German). Erlangen: Müller. ISBN 9783860700365.
- Gröner, Erich; Jung, Dieter; Maass, Martin (1991). German Warships 1815–1945, U-boats and Mine Warfare Vessels. Vol. 2. Translated by Thomas, Keith; Magowan, Rachel. London: Conway Maritime Press. ISBN 0-85177-593-4.
- Möller, Eberhard; Brack, Werner (2004). The Encyclopedia of U-Boats. London: Chatham. ISBN 1-85367-623-3.
- Rössler, Eberhard (1981). The U-boat: The evolution and technical history of German submarines. London: Cassell & Co. ISBN 0-304-36120-8.
