= SM U-13 =

Imperial German submarine from WWI

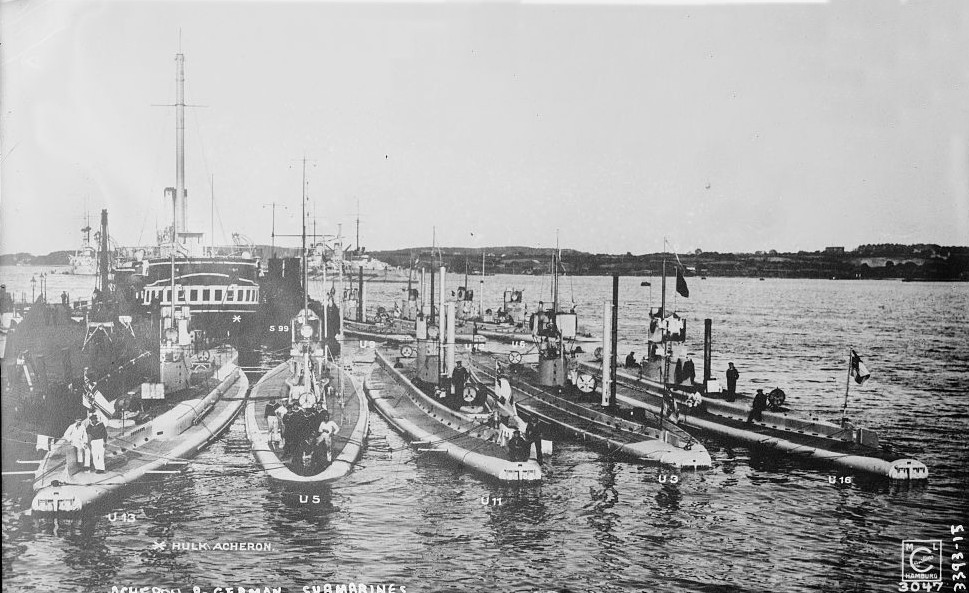
- SM U-13 in the Harbour of Kiel (first boat left)

History

Germany
- Name: U-13
- Ordered: 23 February 1909
- Builder: Kaiserliche Werft Danzig
- Cost: 2,101,070 Goldmark
- Yard number: 8
- Laid down: 1908
- Launched: 16 December 1910
- Commissioned: 25 April 1912
- Fate: Sunk in the North Sea at an unknown time and location between 6 August and 12 August 1914

General characteristics
- Class & type: Type U 13 submarine
- Displacement: 516 t (508 long tons) surfaced; 644 t (634 long tons) submerged
- Length: 57.88 m (189 ft 11 in)
- Beam: 6 m (19 ft 8 in)
- Draught: 3.44 m (11 ft 3 in)
- Propulsion: 2 shafts; 2 × Körting 6-cylinder and 2 × Körting 8-cylinder two stroke paraffin motors with 900 PS (660 kW; 890 shp); 2 × SSW electric motors with 1,040 PS (760 kW; 1,030 shp); 550 rpm surfaced; 600 rpm submerged
- Speed: 14.8 knots (27.4 km/h; 17.0 mph) surfaced; 10.7 knots (19.8 km/h; 12.3 mph) submerged
- Range: 2,000 nautical miles (3,700 km; 2,300 mi) at 14 kn
- Test depth: 50 m (160 ft)
- Boats & landing craft carried: 1 dinghy
- Complement: 4 officers, 25 men
- Armament: 4 × 45 cm (17.7 in) torpedo tubes (2 each bow and stern) with 6 torpedoes

Service record
- Part of: I Flotilla; 1 August 1914 – 12 August 1914
- Commanders: Kptlt. Han Artur Graf von Schweinitz und Krain; 1–12 August 1914
- Operations: 1 patrol
- Victories: None

SM U-13 (Note: "SM" stands for "Seiner Majestät" (English: His Majesty's) and combined with the U for Unterseeboot would be translated as His Majesty's Submarine.) was one of 329 U-boats which served in the Imperial German Navy during World War I.

The first of three submarines of the gasoline powered Type U 13 class, the boat was ordered in February 1909 and built at Kaiserliche Werft Danzig. It was launched in December 1910 and commissioned into the Imperial German Navy on 25 April 1912.

At the start of World War I U-13 was commanded by Kapitänleutnant Hans Arthur Graf von Schweinitz und Krain, a career officer who had joined the Navy in 1902. The boat left port at Heligoland in early August 1914 as part of a coordinated attack by U-boats on the British naval base at Scapa Flow. The boat was not heard from again. She is recorded as having been lost between 6 and 12 August, and may have been a victim of the German defensive minefield in the Heligoland Bight, or been sunk due to an accident or mechanical failure. All of the crew were lost.
