= Type U 127 submarine =

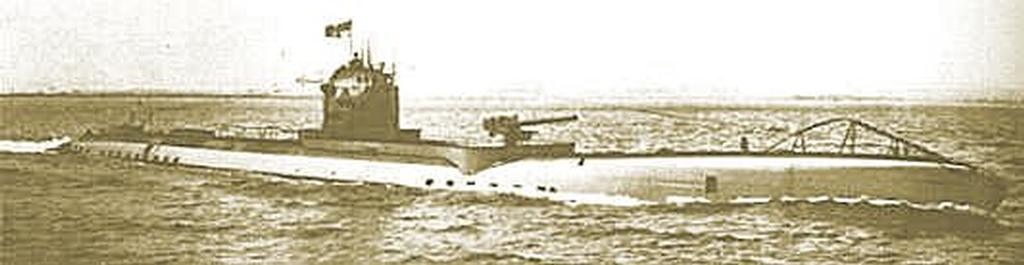
- SM U-135 at sea

Class overview
- Builders: AG Weser, Bremen; Germaniawerft, Kiel; Kaiserliche Werft, Danzig; Bremer Vulkan, Vegesack
- Operators: Imperial German Navy
- Preceded by: Type UE II
- Succeeded by: Type U 139
- Cost: 6,438,000 Mark
- Built: 1913-1918
- Building: 8
- Completed: 0

General characteristics
- Displacement: 1,160–1,221 t (1,142–1,202 long tons)(surfaced); 1,527–1,649 t (1,503–1,623 long tons) (submerged)
- Length: 82.05–82.50 m (269 ft 2 in – 270 ft 8 in) (o/a); 65.15–65.57 m (213 ft 9 in – 215 ft 1 in) (pressure hull)
- Beam: 7.54 m (24 ft 9 in) (o/a); 4.83–4.85 m (15 ft 10 in – 15 ft 11 in) (pressure hull)
- Height: 9.46 m (31 ft)
- Draught: 4.02 m (13 ft 2 in)
- Installed power: 2 × diesel engines, 3,255–3,452 bhp (2,427–2,574 kW) total; 2 × diesel generators for surface dash, 888 brake horsepower (662 kW) total; 2 × electric motors, 1,667 shp (1,243 kW) total
- Propulsion: 2 × propeller shafts; 2 × 1.85 m (6 ft 1 in) propellers
- Speed: 17 knots (31 km/h; 20 mph) (surfaced); 8.1 knots (15.0 km/h; 9.3 mph) (submerged)
- Range: 10,000 nmi (19,000 km; 12,000 mi) at 8 knots (15 km/h; 9.2 mph) (surfaced) 50 nmi (93 km; 58 mi) at 4.5 knots (8.3 km/h; 5.2 mph)(submerged)
- Test depth: 75 m (246 ft)
- Complement: 44 men
- Armament: 6 × 50 cm (19.7 in) torpedo tubes (4 bow, 2 stern); 14 × torpedoes; 2 × 15 cm (5.9 in) SK L/45 deck gun

Type U 127 submarine was a class of U-boats built during World War I by the Kaiserliche Marine.

== Design ==
The U-boats carried 16 torpedoes and had various arrangements of deck guns. Some had only one; others had two 15 cm (5.9 in) SK L/45 guns.

They carried a crew of 44 and had excellent seagoing abilities with a cruising range of around 10,000 nautical miles (19,000 km; 12,000 mi).

== List of Type U 127 submarines ==
There were eight Type U 127 submarines built for the Kaiserliche Marine between 1913 and 1918. Only one was launched before the Armistice with Germany in 1918 and was subsequently surrendered to the Allies. The unfinished boats were broken up for scrap after the war.

- SM U-127（1913）
- SM U-128（1913）
- SM U-129（1913）
- SM U-130（1913）
- SM U-131（1914）
- SM U-132（1914）
- SM U-133（1915）
- SM U-134（1916）
