= List of most successful German U-boats =

Type VIIC U-boat

List of successful U-boats contains lists of the most successful German U-boats in the two World Wars based on total tonnage.

== World War I ==
This list contains the 5 most successful German U-boats during the First World War based on total tonnage. Only sunk commercial vessels are included, not military (warships) nor damaged ships.

5 Top-scoring U-boats of World War I
Boat	Type	Commissioned	Total tonnage	Ships sunk	Patrols	Fate	Captains
SM U-35	Type U 31	3 November 1914	505,121	220	17	Surrendered, 26 November 1918	Waldemar Kophamel; Lothar von Arnauld de la Perière; Ernst von Voigt; Heino von Heimburg
SM U-39	Type U 31	13 January 1915	404,774	149	19	Surrendered, 22 March 1919	Hans Kratzsch; Walter Forstmann; Heinrich Metzger
SM U-38	Type U 31	15 December 1914	287,811	134	17	Surrendered, 23 February 1919	Max Valentiner; Wilhelm Canaris; Hans Heinrich Wurmbach; Clemens Wickel
SM U-34	Type U 31	5 October 1914	257,652	119	17	Missing, 9 November 1918	Claus Rücker; Wilhelm Canaris; Johannes Klasing
SM U-53	Type U 51	22 April 1916	224,314	87	13	Surrendered, 1 December 1918	Hans Rose; Otto von Schrader

== World War II ==
This list contains the 10 most successful German U-boats during the Second World War based on total tonnage. Both commercial and military vessels (warships) are included but only sunk ships are included, not damaged ships.

10 Top-scoring U-boats of World War II
Boat	Type	Commissioned	Total tonnage	Ships sunk	Patrols	Fate	Captains
U-48	VIIB	22 April 1939	300,537	51	12	Scuttled, 3 May 1945	Herbert Schultze; Hans-Rudolf Rösing; Heinrich Bleichrodt
U-99	VIIB	18 April 1940	244,658	38	8	Scuttled, 17 March 1941 after depth charging by HMS Walker.	Otto Kretschmer
U-103	IXB	18 April 1940	237,596	45	11	Decommissioned March 1944. Sunk by bombs in Kiel, 15 April 1945.	Viktor Schütze; Werner Winter
U-124	IXB	11 June 1940	225,637	48	11	Lost with all hands, 2 April 1943 after depth charging by HMS Stonecrop and HMS Black Swan.	Georg-Wilhelm Schulz; Johann Mohr
U-123	IXB	30 May 1940	222,705	44	12	Decommissioned 17 June 1944. Scuttled in port, 19 August 1944. Refloated and taken into French service as Blaison.	Karl-Heinz Moehle; Reinhard Hardegen; Horst von Schroeter
U-107	IXB	8 October 1940	217,786	39	13	Lost with all hands 18 August 1944 after depth charging by a Sunderland of 201 Squadron RAF.	Günter Hessler; Harald Gelhaus; Volker Simmermacher; Karl-Heinz Fritz
U-37	IX	4 August 1938	202,467	55	11	Scuttled, 8 May 1945	Heinrich Schuch; Werner Hartmann; Victor Oehrn; Asmus Nicolai Clausen; Ulrich Folkers
U-66	IXC	20 March 1940	200,021	33	9	Sunk 6 May 1944 by Grumman F4F Wildcats and Grumman TBF Avengers of USS Block Island, rammed by destroyer escort USS Buckley.	Richard Zapp; Friedrich Markworth; Paul Frerks; Gerhard Seehausen
U-68	IXC	11 February 1941	197,998	33	10	Sunk 10 April 1944, depth charges and rockets fired by F4F Wildcats and TBM Avengers of USS Guadalcanal.	Karl-Friedrich Merten; Albert Lauzemis; Ekkehard Scherraus; Gerhard Seehausen; Albert Lauzemis
U-47	VIIB	17 December 1938	191,919	31	10	Missing with all hands, on or about 7 March 1941 while patrolling south of Iceland between 59 deg and 62 deg north. Reason behind her sinking is still unknown with theories ranging from attacks by corvettes HMS Camellia and HMS Arbutus, mines, mechanical failure, and possibly becoming victim of her own torpedoes.	Günther Prien
