= SM U-31 (Germany) =

History

German Empire
- Name: U-31
- Ordered: 29 March 1912
- Builder: Germaniawerft, Kiel
- Yard number: 191
- Laid down: 12 October 1912
- Launched: 7 January 1914
- Commissioned: 18 September 1914
- Fate: c. 13 January 1915 – Mined in the North Sea; all hands lost.

General characteristics
- Class & type: Type U 31 submarine
- Displacement: 685 t (674 long tons) (surfaced); 878 t (864 long tons) (submerged)
- Length: 64.70 m (212 ft 3 in) (o/a); 52.36 m (171 ft 9 in) (pressure hull)
- Beam: 6.32 m (20 ft 9 in) (o/a); 4.05 m (13 ft 3 in) (pressure hull)
- Draught: 3.56 m (11 ft 8 in)
- Installed power: 2 × 1,850 PS (1,361 kW; 1,825 shp) diesel engines; 2 × 1,200 PS (883 kW; 1,184 shp) Doppelmodyn
- Propulsion: 2 × shafts; 2 × 1.60 m (5 ft 3 in) propellers
- Speed: 16.4 knots (30.4 km/h; 18.9 mph) (surfaced); 9.7 knots (18.0 km/h; 11.2 mph) (submerged)
- Range: 8,790 nmi (16,280 km; 10,120 mi) at 8 knots (15 km/h; 9.2 mph) (surfaced); 80 nmi (150 km; 92 mi) at 5 knots (9.3 km/h; 5.8 mph) (submerged)
- Test depth: 50 m (164 ft 1 in)
- Boats & landing craft carried: 1 dinghy
- Complement: 4 officers, 31 enlisted
- Armament: four 50 cm (20 in) torpedo tubes (2 each bow and stern); 6 torpedoes

Service record
- Part of: IV Flotilla; 18 September 1914 – 13 January 1915
- Commanders: Oblt.z.S. Siegfried Wachendorff; 1 August 1914 – 13 January 1915
- Operations: 1 patrol
- Victories: None

SM U-31 (Note: "SM" stands for "Seiner Majestät" (English: His Majesty's) and combined with the U for Unterseeboot would be translated as His Majesty's Submarine.) was one of the 329 submarines serving in the Imperial German Navy in World War I. U-31 was engaged in the naval warfare and took part in the First Battle of the Atlantic.

U-31 sailed from Wilhelmshaven on 13 January 1915 but disappeared shortly thereafter. It was assumed, correctly, she had struck a mine, and sunk with all hands somewhere in the North Sea.

== Design ==
Type U 31 submarines were double-hulled ocean-going submarines similar to Type 23 and Type 27 subs in dimensions and differed only slightly in propulsion and speed. They were considered very good high seas boats with average manoeuvrability and good surface steering.

U-31 had an overall length of 64.70 m (212 ft 3 in), her pressure hull was 52.36 m (171 ft 9 in) long. The boat's beam was 6.32 m (20 ft 9 in) (o/a), while the pressure hull measured 4.05 m (13 ft 3 in). Type 31s had a draught of 3.56 m (11 ft 8 in) with a total height of 7.68–8.04 m (25 ft 2 in – 26 ft 5 in). The boats displaced a total of 971 tonnes (956 long tons); 685 t (674 long tons) when surfaced and 878 t (864 long tons) when submerged.

U-31 was fitted with two Germania 6-cylinder two-stroke diesel engines with a total of 1,850 metric horsepower (1,361 kW; 1,825 bhp) for use on the surface and two Siemens-Schuckert double-acting electric motors with a total of 1,200 PS (883 kW; 1,184 shp) for underwater use. These engines powered two shafts each with a 1.60 m (5 ft 3 in) propeller, which gave the boat a top surface speed of 16.4 knots (30.4 km/h; 18.9 mph), and 9.7 knots (18.0 km/h; 11.2 mph) when submerged. Cruising range was 8,790 nautical miles (16,280 km; 10,120 mi) at 8 knots (15 km/h; 9.2 mph) on the surface, and 80 nmi (150 km; 92 mi) at 5 knots (9.3 km/h; 5.8 mph) under water. Diving depth was 50 m (164 ft 1 in).

The U-boat was armed with four 50 cm (20 in) torpedo tubes, two fitted in the bow and two in the stern, and carried 6 torpedoes. The boat's complement was 4 officers and 31 enlisted.

== Wreck discovery ==
The wreck of U-31 had been discovered in 2012 about 55 miles (89 km) off the coast of East Anglia during surveys made in preparation for the construction of an offshore wind farm. However, the wreck was not formally identified until 9 September 2015 when the Dutch Lamlash wreck-diving team discovered the hull number engraved on a salvaged item of navigation equipment.

=== Summary ===
2012: Wreck found during sonar survey by Fugro for Offshore Windfarm Project by Scottish Power Renewables

2013 and 2014: Wreck surveyed by RNLNavy with divers and sonar in the course of the search for the wreck of HNLMS O13, lost on patrol in June 1940 in the North Sea. This wreck could be classified as a World War I SM U-31 series U-boat

2015: Wreck positively identified by Dutch divers from mv Lamlash - Haarlem as the SM U-31 (Hull number found on a “Fahrt Tabelle” (Manoeuvring Settings Table)).

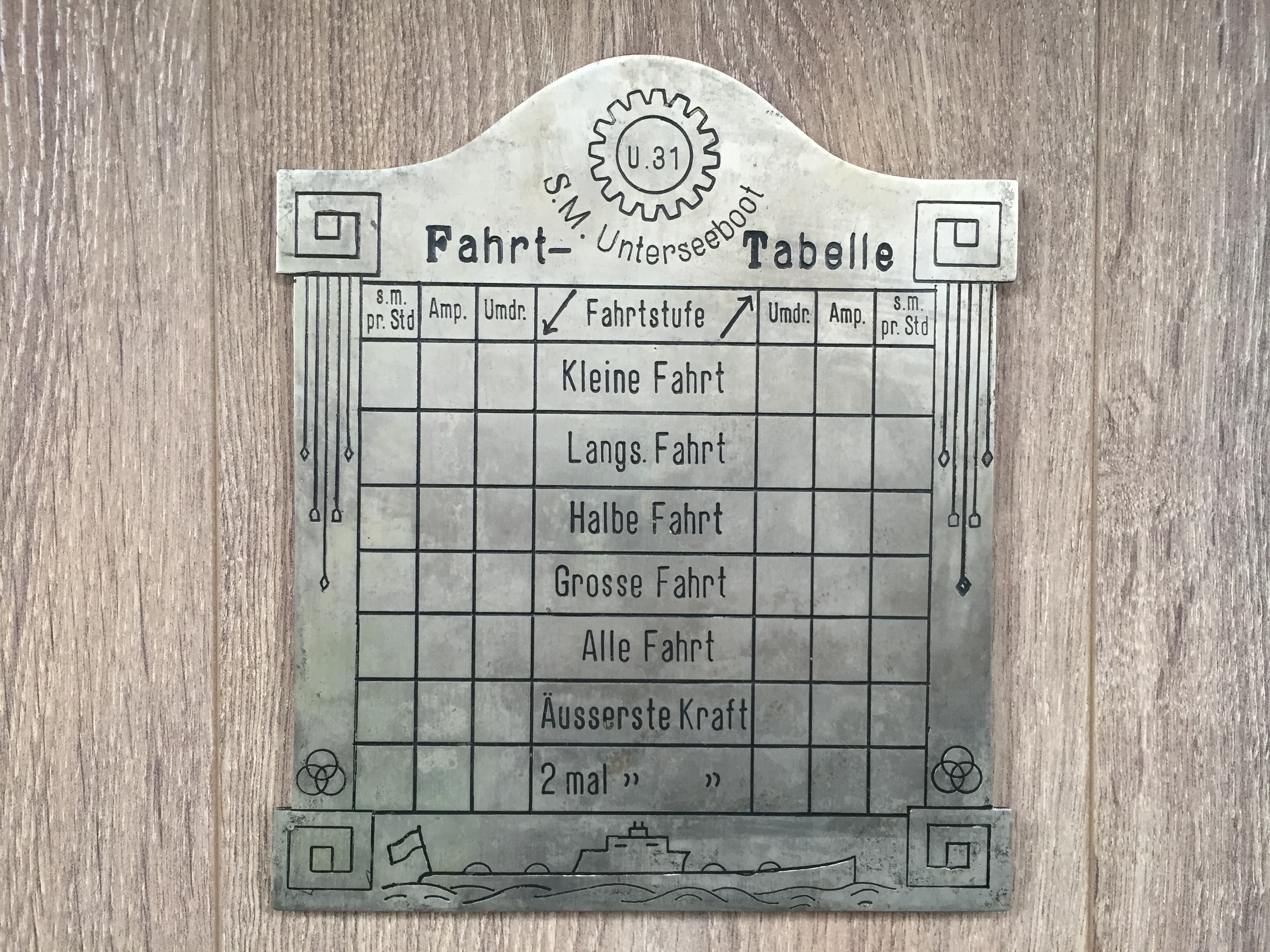

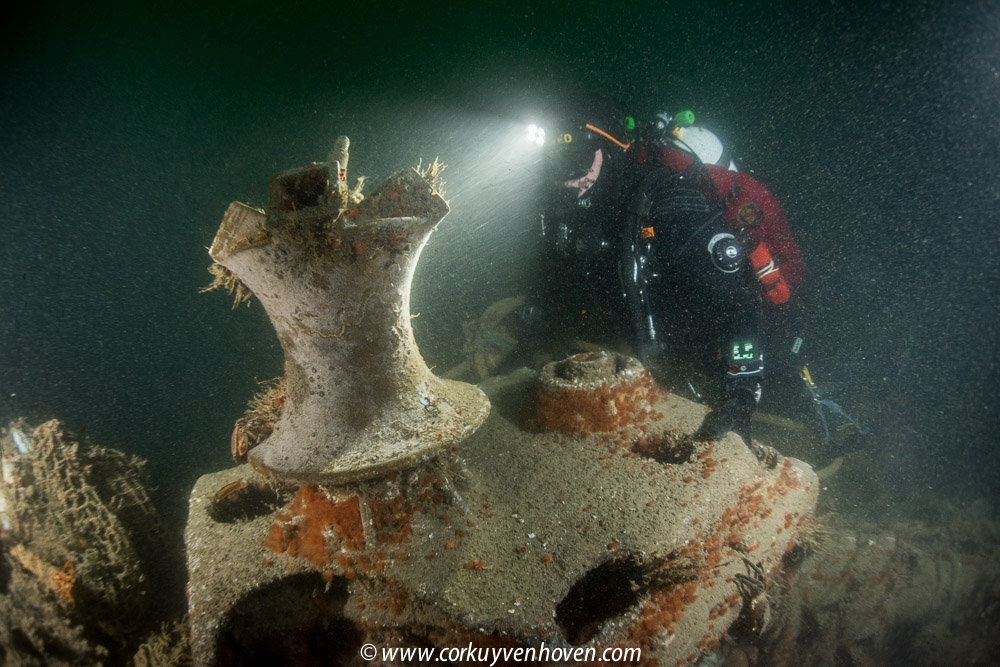

== Bibliography ==
- Gröner, Erich; Jung, Dieter; Maass, Martin (1991). U-boats and Mine Warfare Vessels. German Warships 1815–1945. Vol. 2. Translated by Thomas, Keith; Magowan, Rachel. London: Conway Maritime Press. ISBN 0-85177-593-4.
- Kemp, Paul (1997). U-boats destroyed, German submarine losses in the World Wars. London: Arms & Armour Press. p. 11. ISBN 1-85409-321-5.
