= List of shipwrecks in March 1915 =

The list of shipwrecks in March 1915 includes ships sunk, foundered, grounded, or otherwise lost during March 1915.

== 1 March ==
List of shipwrecks: 1 March 1915
Ship	State	Description
Princess May	United Kingdom	The ketch was run down and sunk in the North Sea off Great Yarmouth, Norfolk by Gunnar (Norway). Her crew survived.
Sapphire	United Kingdom	World War I: The trawler struck a mine and sank in the North Sea off Filey, Yorkshire with the loss of a crew member.

== 2 March ==
List of shipwrecks: 2 March 1915
Ship	State	Description
Rumija	Montenegro	World War I: The steam yacht was sunk at Antivari, Montenegro by Austro-Hungarian naval ships.

== 3 March ==
List of shipwrecks: 3 March 1915
Ship	State	Description
Cornish Coast	United Kingdom	The coaster collided with the interned Jeanette Woermann (Germany) and sank in the River Mersey at Liverpool, Lancashire with the loss of six of her fourteen crew. The survivors were rescued by a tug.
HMT Rondo	Royal Navy	The naval trawler was wrecked off the Shetland Islands. Her crew survived.
Tiflis	Belgium	The tug suffered an onboard explosion and fire at Alicante, Spain with the loss of five of her ten crew. Although declared a constructive total loss, She was sold in April 1915, repaired and returned to service.

== 4 March ==
List of shipwrecks: 4 March 1915
Ship	State	Description
Desola	Canada	The steamer suffered a series of explosions, burned, and sank in the harbour at St. John's, Newfoundland.
Risøy	Norway	The cargo ship collided with Warsaw (United Kingdom) in the North Sea off the Nore Lightship (United Kingdom) and sank. Her crew were rescued.
SM U-8	Imperial German Navy	World War I: The Type U 5 submarine became trapped in nets in the English Channel off Seaford, Sussex, United Kingdom (50°41′N 0°06′E) and was scuttled.

== 5 March ==
List of shipwrecks: 5 March 1915
Ship	State	Description
HMT Calliope II	Royal Navy	The naval trawler collided with another vessel off the Butt of Lewis (58°31′00″N 5°45′30″W) and sank with the loss of a crew member.
Dongola	United Kingdom	The ship collided with Espagne (Belgium) and was beached in Porthkerry Bay. Her passengers were taken off by two Royal Navy patrol ships. She was subsequently refloated, repaired and returned to service.

== 6 March ==
List of shipwrecks: 6 March 1915
Ship	State	Description
Glendalough	United Kingdom	The schooner sprang a leak and foundered in the Irish Sea off Skerries, County Dublin.
HMT John Sherburn	Royal Navy	The naval trawler ran aground and was wrecked near Dover, Kent.

== 7 March ==
List of shipwrecks: 7 March 1915
Ship	State	Description
Bengrove	United Kingdom	World War I: The collier was torpedoed and sunk in the Bristol Channel 5 nautical miles (9.3 km) north north east of Ilfracombe, Devon by SM U-20 (Imperial German Navy): All 33 crew were rescued.

== 8 March ==
List of shipwrecks: 8 March 1915
Ship	State	Description
HMT Okino	Royal Navy	The naval trawler was lost on this date.

== 9 March ==
List of shipwrecks: 9 March 1915
Ship	State	Description
Aberdon	United Kingdom	World War I: The cargo ship was torpedoed and sunk in the North Sea off St. Abb's Head, Berwickshire by SM U-12 (Imperial German Navy) with the loss of fifteen crew.
Blackwood	United Kingdom	World War I: The cargo ship was torpedoed and sunk in the English Channel 18 nautical miles (33 km) south west by south of Dungeness, Kent by SM U-35 (Imperial German Navy). Her crew survived.
Gris Nez	France	World War I: The trawler was shelled and sunk in the English Channel 20 nautical miles (37 km) west south west of Beachy Head, Sussex, United Kingdom by SM U-35 (Imperial German Navy). Her crew survived.
Princess Victoria	United Kingdom	World War I: The cargo ship was sunk in Liverpool Bay 16 nautical miles (30 km) north west by north of the Liverpool Bar Lightship (United Kingdom) by SM U-20 (Imperial German Navy). Her crew survived.
Tangistan	United Kingdom	World War I: The cargo ship was torpedoed and sunk in the North Sea off Scarborough, Yorkshire with the loss of 37 of her 38 crew. The survivor was rescued by Woodville (United Kingdom).

== 10 March ==
List of shipwrecks: 10 March 1915
Ship	State	Description
HMT Manx Hero	Royal Navy	The naval trawler was lost on this date.
U-12	Imperial German Navy	World War I: The Type U 9 submarine was shelled by Ariel and Attack then rammed by Acheron (all Royal Navy) in the North Sea off Eyemouth, Berwickshire and sank with the loss of nineteen of her 29 crew.

== 11 March ==
List of shipwrecks: 11 March 1915
Ship	State	Description
Auguste Conseil	France	World War I: The cargo ship was sunk in the English Channel 22 nautical miles (41 km) south of Start Point, Devon, United Kingdom by SM U-29 (Imperial German Navy). Her crew were rescued by Excellence Pleske (Denmark).
HMS Bayano	Royal Navy	World War I: The armed merchant cruiser was torpedoed and sunk in the North Channel 3 nautical miles (5.6 km) off Corsewall Point, Dumfriesshire (55°03′N 5°26′W) by SM U-27 (Imperial German Navy). Twenty-six survivors were rescued by Balmarino (United Kingdom) and HMS Tara (Royal Navy). 196 members of the crew perished.
Florazan	United Kingdom	World War I: The cargo ship was torpedoed and damaged in the North Sea 53 nautical miles (98 km) north east of the Longships Lighthouse by SM U-20 (Imperial German Navy) with the loss of a crew member. She sank on 13 March 50 nautical miles (93 km) south west of St. Ann's Head, Pembrokeshire, Wales.

== 12 March ==
List of shipwrecks: 12 March 1915
Ship	State	Description
Andalusian	United Kingdom	World War I: The cargo ship was scuttled in the Atlantic Ocean 25 nautical miles (46 km) west north west of the Bishop Rock, Isles of Scilly by SM U-29 (Imperial German Navy). Her crew survived.
Headlands	United Kingdom	World War I: The cargo ship was torpedoed and sunk in the Atlantic Ocean 8 nautical miles (15 km) south of the Isles of Scilly (49°51′N 6°26′W) by SM U-29 (Imperial German Navy). Her crew survived.
Indian City	United Kingdom	World War I: The cargo ship was sunk in the Atlantic Ocean 10 nautical miles (19 km) south of St Mary's, Isles of Scilly (49°30′N 6°15′W) by SM U-29 (Imperial German Navy). Her crew survived.
Inga	Bermuda	The schooner was driven ashore on Bermuda and was wrecked.

== 13 March ==
List of shipwrecks: 13 March 1915
Ship	State	Description
HMT G.M.V.	Royal Navy	The naval trawler collided with another vessel 0.5 nautical miles (0.93 km; 0.58 mi) off Larne, County Antrim and sank.
Hanna	Sweden	World War I: The cargo ship was reported to have been torpedoed and sunk in the North Sea off Flamborough Head, Yorkshire, United Kingdom with the loss of six of her twenty crew. According to Swedish official War statistics, it cannot be determined whether it was a torpedo or a mine which caused the explosion.
Hartdale	United Kingdom	World War I: The cargo ship was torpedoed and sunk off the South Rock (54°25′N 5°08′W) by SM U-27 (Imperial German Navy) with the loss of two of her crew.
Helene	Denmark	The cargo ship ran aground at Landskrona, Skåne County Sweden. She was refloated on 16 March.
Invergyle	United Kingdom	World War I: The collier was sunk in the North Sea 12 nautical miles (22 km) north north east of the mouth of the River Tyne by SM U-23 (Imperial German Navy). Her crew survived.
Nonpareil	United States	The 52-gross register ton steam cod-fishing schooner drifted ashore on Unga Island in the Shumagin Islands off the Alaska Peninsula during a gale and sank. Her entire crew of seven survived.

== 14 March ==
List of shipwrecks: 14 March 1915
Ship	State	Description
SMS Dresden	Imperial German Navy	World War I: Battle of Más a Tierra: The Dresden-class cruiser was scuttled off Más a Tierra, Chile.
HMT Orlando	Royal Navy	The naval trawler was lost on this date.

== 15 March ==
List of shipwrecks: 15 March 1915
Ship	State	Description
Fingal	United Kingdom	World War I: The cargo ship was torpedoed and sunk in the North Sea 6 nautical miles (11 km) east by south of Coquet Island, Northumberland by SM U-23 (Imperial German Navy) with the loss of six crew.
Pass of Balhamas	United States	The motor vessel stranded at Westerland, Germany. Later salvaged.
William J. Quillin	United States	The schooner collided with Laly (Norway) in the Atlantic Ocean off Cape Hatteras, North Carolina and sank.

== 17 March ==
List of shipwrecks: 17 March 1915
Ship	State	Description
Leeuwarden	United Kingdom	World War I: The coaster was captured, shelled and sunk in the North Sea 4 nautical miles (7.4 km) west by north of the Maas Lightship (Netherlands) by SM U-28 (Imperial German Navy). Her crew survived.

== 18 March ==
List of shipwrecks: 18 March 1915
Ship	State	Description
Bouvet	French Navy	Bouvet sinking. World War I: Naval operations in the Dardanelles Campaign:The pre-dreadnought battleship struck a mine in the Dardanelles and sank with the loss of 660 of her 710 crew.
Clara	United Kingdom	The ketch got into difficulties in the Teifi Estuary. Her two crew were rescued by Elizabeth Austin ( Royal National Lifeboat Institution).
Glenartney	United Kingdom	World War I: The cargo ship was torpedoed and sunk in the English Channel 4 nautical miles (7.4 km) south of the Owers Lightship (United Kingdom) (50°36′N 0°25′E) by SM U-34 (Imperial German Navy) with the loss of a crew member. https://www.uboat.net/wwi/ships_hit/2518.html
Gaulois	French Navy	World War I: The Charlemagne-class battleship struck a mine and was damaged in the Dardanelles. She was beached but was refloated on 22 March. Subsequently repaired and returned to service.
HMS Irresistible	Royal Navy	HMS Irresistible World War I: Naval operations in the Dardanelles Campaign: The Formidable-class battleship struck a mine in the Dardanelles and sank with the loss of about 150 of her 780 crew. Survivors were rescued by HMS Wear (Royal Navy).
Mary Nish	United Kingdom	The schooner capsized and sank in the North Sea off the mouth of the River Tyne with the loss of four lives.
HMS Ocean	Royal Navy	World War I: Naval operations in the Dardanelles Campaign: The Canopus-class battleship struck a mine in the Dardanelles and sank.
SM U-29	Imperial German Navy	World War I: The Type U 27 submarine was rammed and sunk in the Pentland Firth (58°20′N 0°57′E) by HMS Dreadnought (Royal Navy) with the loss of all 32 crew.
SS Upas	United Kingdom	The vessel foundered off the coast of Portavogie, County Down, Ireland after her cargo shifted in bad weather.

== 19 March ==
List of shipwrecks: 19 March 1915
Ship	State	Description
Gravesend	United Kingdom	The schooner was abandoned in The Downs 0.5 nautical miles (0.93 km; 0.58 mi) north west of the Gull Lightship (United Kingdom). Her crew were rescued by Alert (United Kingdom).

== 21 March ==
List of shipwrecks: 21 March 1915
Ship	State	Description
Cairntorr	United Kingdom	World War I: The cargo ship was torpedoed and sunk in the English Channel 7 nautical miles (13 km) south of Beachy Head, Sussex 50°40′N 0°15′E by SM U-34 (Imperial German Navy). Her crew were rescued by the Eastbourne Lifeboat and the Newhaven Lifeboat.
HM Torpedo Boat 64	Royal Navy	The torpedo boat ran aground and was wrecked in the Aegean Sea.

== 22 March ==
List of shipwrecks: 22 March 1915
Ship	State	Description
Concord	United Kingdom	World War I: The cargo ship was torpedoed and sunk in the English Channel 9 nautical miles (17 km) south east by east of the Royal Sovereign Lightship (United Kingdom) by SM U-34 (Imperial German Navy). Her crew survived.

== 23 March ==
List of shipwrecks: 23 March 1915
Ship	State	Description
Unknown dredge	United States	The dredge burned and sank near Elizabethport, New Jersey.

== 25 March ==
List of shipwrecks: 25 March 1915
Ship	State	Description
Delmira	United Kingdom	World War I: The cargo ship was intercepted in the English Channel 23 nautical miles (43 km) north north east of the Cap d'Antifer, Pas-de-Calais, France by SM U-37 (Imperial German Navy). An attempt was made to scuttle her but it did not succeed. Delmira subsequently drifted ashore. Later salvaged, repaired and returned to service.
USS F-4	United States Navy	The F-class submarine sank in the Pacific Ocean 1.5 nautical miles (2.8 km) off Honolulu, Territory of Hawaii in 300 feet (91 m) of water, with the loss of all 21 crew. She was raised and taken to Pearl Harbor, for study, arriving 29 August. She was never repaired, Stricken 31 August 1915.
Medea	Netherlands	World War I: The cargo ship was shelled and sunk in the English Channel off Beachy Head, Sussex, United Kingdom by SM U-28 (Imperial German Navy). Her crew were rescued by HMS Teviot (Royal Navy).
Tamar	United Kingdom	World War I: The cargo ship was shelled and sunk in the Atlantic Ocean 500 nautical miles (930 km) east north east of Pernambuco, Brazil by SMS Kronprinz Wilhelm (Imperial German Navy).

== 27 March ==
List of shipwrecks: 27 March 1915
Ship	State	Description
Aguila	United Kingdom	World War I: The cargo liner was torpedoed and sunk in the Atlantic Ocean 47 nautical miles (87 km) south west of the Smalls Lighthouse by SM U-28 (Imperial German Navy) with the loss of eight lives. Some of the survivors were rescued by the trawler Ottilie (United Kingdom).
Coleby	United Kingdom	World War I: The cargo ship was shelled and sunk in the Atlantic Ocean 460 nautical miles (850 km) north east of Pernambuco, Brazil by SMS Kronprinz Wilhelm (Imperial German Navy).
South Point	United Kingdom	World War I: The cargo ship was torpedoed and sunk in the Atlantic Ocean 60 nautical miles (110 km) west of Lundy Island, Devon by SM U-28 (Imperial German Navy). Her crew survived.
Vosges	United Kingdom	World War I: The cargo ship was shelled and sunk in the Atlantic Ocean 38 nautical miles (70 km) west by north of Trevose Head, Cornwall (50°42′N 5°35′W) by SM U-28 (Imperial German Navy) with the loss of a crew member. Survivors were rescued by HMS Wintona (Royal Navy).

== 28 March ==
List of shipwrecks: 28 March 1915
Ship	State	Description
Falaba	United Kingdom	World War I: Thrasher incident: The ocean liner was torpedoed and sunk in St. George's Channel 38 nautical miles (70 km) west of the Smalls Lighthouse by SM U-28 (Imperial German Navy) with the loss of 104 lives. Survivors were rescued by three trawlers, amongst them Eileen Emma and Wenlock (both United Kingdom).

== 29 March ==
List of shipwrecks: 29 March 1915
Ship	State	Description
Amstel	Netherlands	World War I: The coaster struck a mine and sank in the North Sea off Flamborough Head, Yorkshire, United Kingdom. Her crew were rescued by the trawler Pinewold (United Kingdom).
Dakar	United Kingdom	The cargo ship caught fire in the Forcados River, Nigeria. She sank on 31 March.
Flaminian	United Kingdom	World War I: The cargo ship was shelled and sunk in the Atlantic Ocean 50 nautical miles (93 km) south west by west of the Isles of Scilly (49°50′N 7°00′W) by SM U-28 (Imperial German Navy). Her crew survived.
Theodore Weems	United States	The coaster was run into by Heredia (United States) off New Orleans, Louisiana and sank.

== 30 March ==
List of shipwrecks: 30 March 1915
Ship	State	Description
Crown of Castile	United Kingdom	World War I: The cargo ship was scuttled in the Atlantic Ocean 31 nautical miles (57 km) south west of the Bishop Rock, Isles of Scilly (49°25′N 6°50′W) by SM U-28 (Imperial German Navy). Her 43 crew were rescued by Magellan (France).
HMT Trygon	Royal Navy	The 129.9-foot (39.6 m), 289-ton steam naval trawler was lost in a collision in The Clyde, Scotland.

== 31 March ==
List of shipwrecks: 31 March 1915
Ship	State	Description
Emma	France	World War I: The cargo ship was sunk in the English Channel 12 nautical miles (22 km) south of Beachy Head, Sussex, United Kingdom by SM U-37 (Imperial German Navy) with the loss of nineteen of her 21 crew. The survivors were rescued by a Royal Navy destroyer.
Nor	Norway	World War I: The sailing vessel was sunk in the North Sea off Sunderland, County Durham, United Kingdom (56°13′N 4°25′E) by SM U-10 (Imperial German Navy). Her crew survived.
HM Torpedo Boat 64	Royal Navy	The torpedo boat was wrecked in the Aegean Sea.

== Unknown date ==
List of shipwrecks: Unknown date 1915
Ship	State	Description
Spanish Prince	United Kingdom	World War I: The cargo ship was sunk as blockship at Dover, Kent. The wreck was moved in 1930. It was salvaged for scrap in August 2010.
Livonian	United Kingdom	World War I: The cargo ship was sunk as blockship at Dover. the wreck was cleared between 1930 and 1933.
Alberni	Canada	The tug capsized and sank at Active Pass, British Columbia.
