= U29 =

U29 or U-29 may refer to

== Naval vessels ==
- German submarine U-29, various vessels
- HMS Whimbrel (U29), a sloop of the Royal Navy
- SM U-29 (Austria-Hungary), a submarine of the Austro-Hungarian Navy

== Other uses ==
- Snub dodecahedron
- Uppland Runic Inscription 29
