= SS Tellus =

SS Tellus is the name of the following ships:

- SS Tellus (1890), wrecked 21 September 1907
- SS Tellus (1911), sunk 8 September 1916

== See also ==
- Tellus (disambiguation)
