= Type U 31 submarine =

German WWI U-boat class

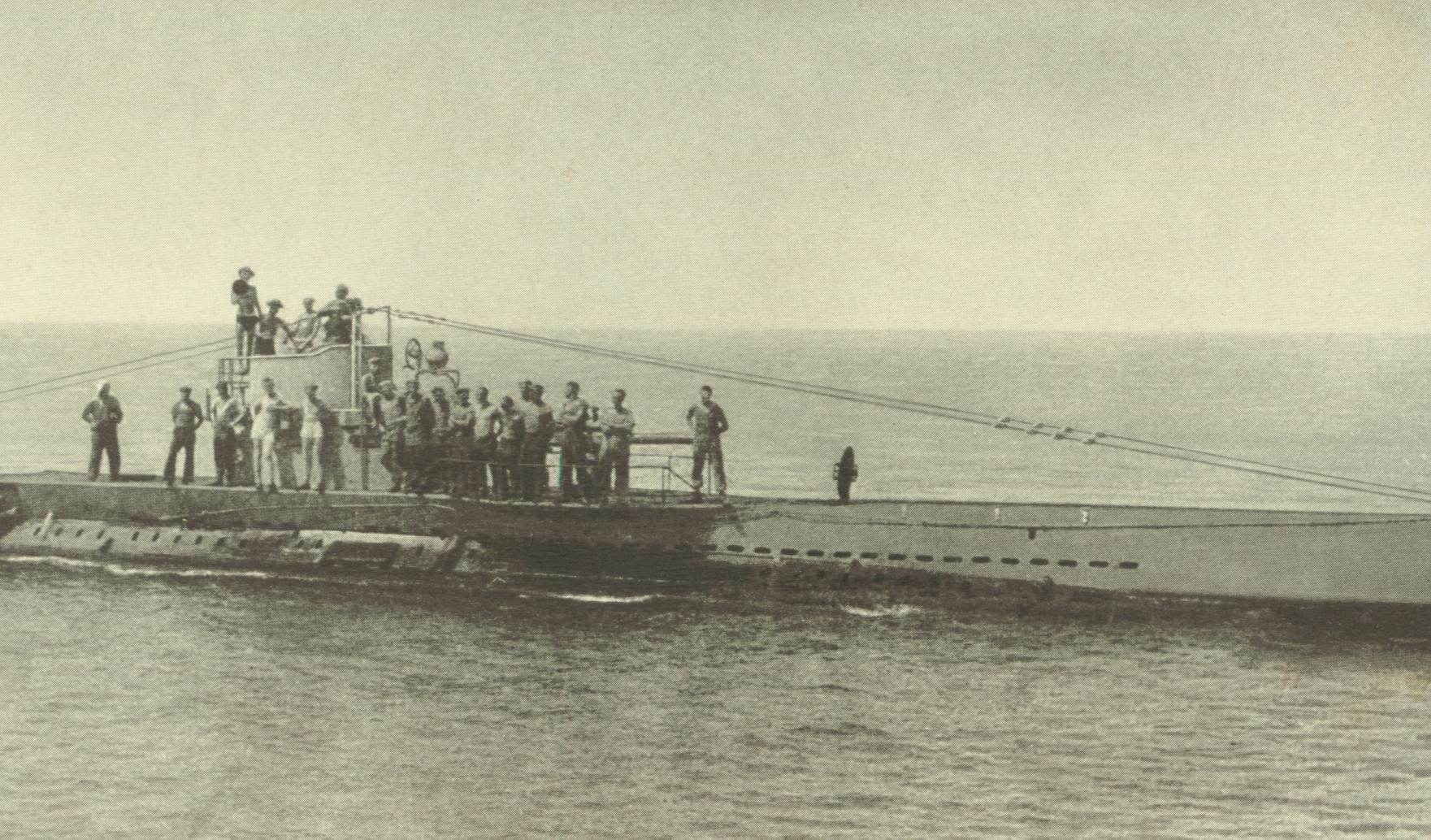
- U-38, a Type U 31 U-boat

Class overview
- Builders: Germaniawerft, Kiel
- Operators: Imperial German Navy
- Preceded by: Type U 27
- Succeeded by: Type U 43
- In commission: 3 September 1914
- Completed: 11
- Lost: 7

General characteristics
- Displacement: 685 t (674 long tons) (surfaced); 878 t (864 long tons) (submerged)
- Length: 64.70 m (212 ft 3 in) (o/a); 52.36 m (171 ft 9 in) (pressure hull)
- Beam: 6.32 m (20 ft 9 in) (o/a); 4.05 m (13 ft 3 in) (pressure hull)
- Draught: 3.56 m (11 ft 8 in)
- Installed power: 2 × 1,850 PS (1,361 kW; 1,825 shp) diesel engines; 2 × 1,200 PS (883 kW; 1,184 shp) Doppelmodyn
- Propulsion: 2 × shafts; 2 × 1.60 m (5.2 ft) propellers
- Speed: 16.4 knots (30.4 km/h; 18.9 mph) (surfaced); 9.7 knots (18.0 km/h; 11.2 mph) (submerged)
- Range: 8,790 nmi (16,280 km; 10,120 mi) at 8 knots (15 km/h; 9.2 mph) (surfaced); 80 nmi (150 km; 92 mi) at 5 knots (9.3 km/h; 5.8 mph) (submerged)
- Test depth: 50 m (164 ft 1 in)
- Complement: 4 officers, 31 enlisted
- Armament: four 50 cm (19.7 in) torpedo tubes (2 each bow and stern); 6 torpedoes; one or two 8.8 cm (3.5 in) SK L/30 – 10.5 cm (4.1 in) SK L/45 deck guns

Type U 31 was a class of U-boats built during World War I by the Kaiserliche Marine.

== Design ==
German Type U 31 submarines were double-hulled ocean-going submarines similar to Type 23 and Type 27 subs in dimensions and differed only slightly in propulsion and speed. They were considered very good high sea boats with average manoeuvrability and good surface steering.

Type U-31s had an overall length of 64.70 m (212 ft 3 in), their pressure hulls were 52.36 m (171 ft 9 in) long. The boats' beam was 6.32 m (20 ft 9 in) (o/a), while the pressure hull measured 4.05 m (13 ft 3 in). Type 31s had a draught of 3.56 m (11 ft 8 in) with a total height of 7.68–8.04 m (25 ft 2 in – 26 ft 5 in). The boats displaced a total of 971 tonnes (956 long tons); 685 t (674 long tons) when surfaced and 878 t (864 long tons) when submerged.

Type U-31s were fitted with two Germania 6-cylinder two-stroke diesel engines with a total of 1,850 metric horsepower (1,361 kW; 1,825 bhp) for use on the surface and two Siemens-Schuckert double-acting electric motors with a total of 1,200 PS (883 kW; 1,184 shp) for underwater use. These engines powered two shafts each with a 1.60 m (5.2 ft) propeller, which gave the boats a top surface speed of 16.4 knots (30.4 km/h; 18.9 mph), and 9.7 knots (18.0 km/h; 11.2 mph) when submerged. Cruising range was 8,790 nautical miles (16,280 km; 10,120 mi) at 8 knots (15 km/h; 9.2 mph) on the surface. Constructional diving depth (Note: Constructional diving depth had a safety factor of 2.5, which meant that crushing depth was 2.5 times construction diving depth.) was 50 m (164 ft 1 in).

The U-boats were armed with four 50 cm (19.7 in) torpedo tubes, two fitted in the bow and two in the stern, and carried 6 torpedoes. Most boats received one or two 8.8 cm (3.5 in) SK L/30 deck guns, which were later replaced with 10.5 cm (4.1 in) SK L/45 guns on some. The boats' complement was 4 officers and 31 enlisted.

== Service history ==
Between 1912 and 1915 eleven were built on Germaniawerft in Kiel. Problems with the timely delivery of their diesel engines led to delays up to eleven months, and they were commissioned between September 1913 and February 1915.

The top three-scoring U-boats were Type 31 U-boats : U-35 with the famous Lothar von Arnauld de la Perière as commander, U-39 with Walter Forstmann and U-38 with Max Valentiner.

Later admiral and head of the Abwehr from 1935 to 1944 Wilhelm Canaris also served as commander on two different Type U 31 U-boats. He first took over from Max Valentiner on U-38 and later on U-34.

== List of Type U 31 submarines ==
There were eleven Type U 31 submarines commissioned into the Kaiserliche Marine.

Boat	Armament	Fate
U-31	no deck gun	lost in January 1915 in the North Sea – Discovered 2012 off the East Anglia Coast and identified September 2015
U-32	two 8.8 cm guns, from 1916/17 one 10.5 cm gun	sunk 5 May 1918 north-west of Malta
U-33	one 8.8 cm gun, from 1916/17 one 10.5 cm gun	surrendered 1919, scrapped
U-34	one 8.8 cm gun, from 1916/17 one 10.5 cm gun	sunk October 1918 in the Mediterranean Sea
U-35	one 7.5 cm gun (1914), one 10.5 cm gun (1916)	surrendered 1918, scrapped
U-36	two 8.8 cm guns, from 1916/17 one 10.5 cm gun	sunk 24 July 1915 west of Rona, Hebrides
U-37	two 8.8 cm guns, from 1916/17 one 10.5 cm gun	sunk by mine in April 1915 in the English Channel
U-38	one 8.8 cm gun, from 1916/17 one 10.5 cm gun	surrendered 1919, scrapped
U-39	one 8.8 cm gun, from 1916/17 one 10.5 cm gun	sunk 18 May 1918 off El Ferrol
U-40	one 8.8 cm gun	sunk 23 June 1915 in the North Sea
U-41	one 8.8 cm gun	sunk 24 September 1915 in the English Channel

== See also ==
- German submarine U-31 (S181)

== Bibliography ==
- Gröner, Erich; Jung, Dieter; Maass, Martin (1991). U-boats and Mine Warfare Vessels. German Warships 1815–1945. Vol. 2. Translated by Thomas, Keith; Magowan, Rachel. London: Conway Maritime Press. ISBN 0-85177-593-4..
- Möller, Eberhard; Brack, Werner (2004). The Encyclopedia of U-Boats. London: Chatham. ISBN 1-85367-623-3.
- Rössler, Eberhard (1981). The U-boat : the evolution and technical history of German submarines. London: Casell. ISBN 0304361208.
