= SM U-34 (Germany) =

German U-boat of World War I

History

German Empire
- Name: U-34
- Ordered: 29 March 1912
- Builder: Germaniawerft, Kiel
- Yard number: 194
- Laid down: 7 November 1912
- Launched: 9 May 1914
- Commissioned: 5 October 1914
- Fate: Missing as of 18 October 1918

General characteristics
- Class & type: Type U 31 submarine
- Displacement: 685 t (674 long tons) (surfaced); 878 t (864 long tons) (submerged)
- Length: 64.70 m (212 ft 3 in) (o/a); 52.36 m (171 ft 9 in) (pressure hull)
- Beam: 6.32 m (20 ft 9 in) (o/a); 4.05 m (13 ft 3 in) (pressure hull)
- Draught: 3.56 m (11 ft 8 in)
- Installed power: 2 × 1,850 PS (1,361 kW; 1,825 shp) diesel engines; 2 × 1,200 PS (883 kW; 1,184 shp) Doppelmodyn
- Propulsion: 2 × shafts; 2 × 1.60 m (5 ft 3 in) propellers
- Speed: 16.4 knots (30.4 km/h; 18.9 mph) (surfaced); 9.7 knots (18.0 km/h; 11.2 mph) (submerged)
- Range: 8,790 nmi (16,280 km; 10,120 mi) at 8 knots (15 km/h; 9.2 mph) (surfaced); 80 nmi (150 km; 92 mi) at 5 knots (9.3 km/h; 5.8 mph) (submerged)
- Test depth: 50 m (164 ft 1 in)
- Boats & landing craft carried: 1 dinghy
- Complement: 4 officers, 31 enlisted
- Armament: four 50 cm (20 in) torpedo tubes (2 each bow and stern); 6 torpedoes; one 8.8 cm (3.5 in) SK L/30 deck gun 10.5 cm (4.1 in) SK L/45 from 1916/17)

Service record
- Part of: II Flotilla; Unknown start - 23 August 1915; Pola / Mittelmeer Flotilla; 23 August 1915 - 21 October 1918
- Commanders: Kptlt. Claus Rücker; 5 October 1914 – 11 December 1916; Kptlt. Johannes Klasing; 12 December 1916 – 17 January 1918; 14 March – 9 November 1918; Kptlt. Wilhelm Canaris; 18 January – 13 March 1918
- Operations: 17 patrols
- Victories: 119 merchant ships sunk (257,652 GRT); 5 merchant ships damaged (14,208 GRT)

SM U-34 (Note: "SM" stands for "Seiner Majestät" (English: His Majesty's) and combined with the U for Unterseeboot would be translated as His Majesty's Submarine.) was a German U-boat of World War I. Launched on 9 May 1914, U-34 sank a total of 119 ships during 17 combat patrols, while damaging another 5 ships. The vessel had three commanders during its time: Kptlt. Claus Rucker, Kptlt. Johannes Klasing, Kptlt. Wilhelm Canaris, and Klasing again, in that order. On 18 October 1918, U-34 sailed for the last time, disappearing with all 38 crew members lost. Although it was claimed that she was depth charged and sunk near Gibraltar by HMS Privet on 9 November 1918, it is believed that the U-boat had been lost prior to that, but it has never been confirmed one way or the other.

During an episode of the documentary TV series 'Mysteries of the Deep', it was claimed that SM U-34 was sunk after its track and silhouette were highlighted underwater by bio-luminance. Marine experts interviewed on the episode speculated that U-34 had sailed through a mass of darkened bio-luminous plankton; the submarine's disturbance caused the plankton to bio-luminously shine in increasing tones as a natural reaction. This bio-luminance revealed the submarine to the British vessel, which then launched a successful depth-charge attack.

U-34 sailed 17 patrols, sinking 119 ships for a total of 257,652 gross register tons (GRT), and damaging another five for 14,208 GRT.

== Design ==
Type U 31 submarines were double-hulled ocean-going submarines similar to Type 23 and Type 27 subs in dimensions and differed only slightly in propulsion and speed. They were considered very good high sea boats with average manoeuvrability and good surface steering.

U-34 had an overall length of 64.70 m (212 ft 3 in), her pressure hull was 52.36 m (171 ft 9 in) long. The boat's beam was 6.32 m (20 ft 9 in) (o/a), while the pressure hull measured 4.05 m (13 ft 3 in). Type 31s had a draught of 3.56 m (11 ft 8 in) with a total height of 7.68–8.04 m (25 ft 2 in – 26 ft 5 in). The boats displaced a total of 971 tonnes (956 long tons); 685 t (674 long tons) when surfaced and 878 t (864 long tons) when submerged.

U-34 was fitted with two Germania 6-cylinder two-stroke diesel engines with a total of 1,850 metric horsepower (1,361 kW; 1,825 bhp) for use on the surface and two Siemens-Schuckert double-acting electric motors with a total of 1,200 PS (883 kW; 1,184 shp) for underwater use. These engines powered two shafts each with a 1.60 m (5 ft 3 in) propeller, which gave the boat a top surface speed of 16.4 knots (30.4 km/h; 18.9 mph), and 9.7 knots (18.0 km/h; 11.2 mph) when submerged. Cruising range was 8,790 nautical miles (16,280 km; 10,120 mi) at 8 knots (15 km/h; 9.2 mph) on the surface, and 80 nmi (150 km; 92 mi) at 5 knots (9.3 km/h; 5.8 mph) under water. Diving depth was 50 m (164 ft 1 in).

The U-boat was armed with four 50 cm (20 in) torpedo tubes, two fitted in the bow and two in the stern, and carried 6 torpedoes. Additionally U-34 was equipped in 1915 with one 8.8 cm (3.5 in) Uk L/30 deck gun, which was replaced with a 10.5 cm (4.1 in) gun in 1916/17. The boat's complement was 4 officers and 31 enlisted.

== Summary of raiding history ==
Date	Name	Nationality	Tonnage (Note: Tonnages are in gross register tons)	Fate
18 March 1915	Blue Jacket	United Kingdom	3,515	Damaged
18 March 1915	Glenartney	United Kingdom	5,201	Sunk
21 March 1915	Cairntorr	United Kingdom	3,588	Sunk
22 March 1915	Concord	United Kingdom	2,861	Sunk
1 June 1915	Victoria	United Kingdom	155	Sunk
2 June 1915	Delta B	Belgium	220	Sunk
2 June 1915	Hirose	United Kingdom	274	Sunk
3 June 1915	Penfeld	France	793	Sunk
4 June 1915	Inkum	United Kingdom	4,747	Sunk
7 June 1915	Superb	Norway	1,515	Sunk
4 September 1915	Natal Transport	United Kingdom	4,107	Sunk
8 September 1915	Indien	France	800	Sunk
9 November 1915	Californian	United Kingdom	6,223	Damaged, sunk later by sister U-35.
10 November 1915	Bosnia	Italy	2,561	Sunk
14 November 1915	Treneglos	United Kingdom	3,886	Sunk
15 November 1915	Orange Prince	United Kingdom	3,583	Sunk
19 November 1915	Hallamshire	United Kingdom	4,420	Sunk
24 December 1915	Ville De La Ciotat	France	6,431	Sunk
24 December 1915	Yeddo	United Kingdom	4,563	Sunk
29 December 1915	Kenkoku Maru	Japan	3,217	Sunk
30 December 1915	Abelia	United Kingdom	3,650	Sunk
1 January 1916	Glengyle	United Kingdom	9,395	Sunk
4 January 1916	Coquet	United Kingdom	4,396	Sunk
3 April 1916	Ellaston	United Kingdom	3,796	Sunk
3 April 1916	Sneaton	United Kingdom	3,470	Sunk
5 April 1916	Chantala	United Kingdom	4,951	Sunk
6 April 1916	Yonne	United Kingdom	4,039	Sunk
8 April 1916	Zafra	United Kingdom	3,578	Sunk
11 April 1916	Angus	United Kingdom	3,619	Sunk
11 April 1916	Imperator	Russia	394	Damaged
12 April 1916	Orlock Head	United Kingdom	1,945	Sunk
12 April 1916	Vega	France	2,957	Sunk
15 May 1916	Mira	France	3,050	Sunk
16 May 1916	San Andrea	Italy	225	Sunk
18 May 1916	Adamantios Korais	Greece	2,947	Sunk
20 May 1916	Erminia	Italy	1,544	Sunk
20 May 1916	Fabbricotti F.	Italy	150	Sunk
20 May 1916	Languedoc	France	1,612	Sunk
21 May 1916	Myosotis	France	356	Sunk
21 May 1916	Tjømø	Norway	1,453	Sunk
22 May 1916	Australia	Italy	1,586	Sunk
22 May 1916	Genista	Italy	1,856	Sunk
22 May 1916	Istros	Greece	1,891	Sunk
22 May 1916	Orealla	Italy	1,876	Sunk
22 May 1916	Roberto G	Italy	587	Sunk
23 May 1916	Cornigliano	Italy	2,862	Sunk
23 May 1916	Regina	Russia	593	Sunk
30 May 1916	Julia Park	United Kingdom	2,900	Sunk
21 August 1916	Maria	Italy	242	Sunk
22 August 1916	San Pietro	Italy	53	Sunk
24 August 1916	Alix	Italy	141	Sunk
24 August 1916	Angelina	Italy	153	Sunk
25 August 1916	Socoa	France	2,772	Sunk
27 August 1916	Torridon	Italy	1,526	Sunk
28 August 1916	Gorgona	Italy	861	Sunk
29 August 1916	Fede	Italy	1,273	Sunk
31 August 1916	Santa Maria	Italy	947	Sunk
31 August 1916	Nostra Signora Assunta	Italy	1,256	Sunk
31 August 1916	Quinto	Italy	836	Sunk
1 September 1916	Baron Yarborough	United Kingdom	1,784	Sunk
1 September 1916	Giuseppe	Italy	180	Sunk
4 September 1916	Pasquale Lauro	Italy	1,188	Sunk
4 September 1916	Silverstream	Italy	1,224	Sunk
7 September 1916	Luigia	Italy	917	Sunk
8 September 1916	Elizabeth IV	Norway	7,395	Sunk
10 September 1916	Elli	Greece	631	Sunk
10 September 1916	Spiridon	Greece	562	Sunk
12 September 1916	Panaghia Akathistou	Greece	421	Sunk
26 October 1916	Valborg	Denmark	207	Sunk
28 October 1916	Germaine	Greece	2,573	Sunk
29 October 1916	Marie Therese	France	219	Sunk
2 November 1916	Giovanni Anteri Beretta	Italy	332	Sunk
4 November 1916	Mogador	France	1,364	Sunk
8 November 1916	Luigi Pastro	Italy	3,228	Sunk
8 November 1916	Sheldrake	United Kingdom	2,697	Sunk
19 March 1917	Angiolina	Italy	3,541	Damaged
20 March 1917	Paul Et Marie	France	321	Sunk
23 March 1917	Artemis	Greece	528	Sunk
23 March 1917	Bellatrix	Norway	2,568	Sunk
23 March 1917	Noli	Italy	1,569	Sunk
28 March 1917	Antonietta R.	Italy	84	Sunk
28 March 1917	Carlo T	Italy	134	Sunk
28 March 1917	Giuseppina	Italy	223	Sunk
28 March 1917	Giuseppina Rosa	Italy	132	Sunk
28 March 1917	La Maria	Italy	43	Sunk
28 March 1917	Pietro Lofaro	Italy	291	Sunk
28 March 1917	Raffaele	Italy	53	Sunk
4 May 1917	Francesco C.	Italy	984	Sunk
9 May 1917	Harpagus	United Kingdom	5,866	Sunk
10 May 1917	Carmen	Spain	319	Sunk
11 May 1917	Lefkosia	Greece	1,087	Sunk
11 May 1917	Medjerda	France	1,918	Sunk
12 May 1917	Zanoni	United Kingdom	3,851	Sunk
14 May 1917	Gravelinoise	France	129	Sunk
14 May 1917	Tejo	Portugal	201	Sunk
15 May 1917	Tung Shan	United Kingdom	3,999	Sunk
16 May 1917	Dorothy Duff	United Kingdom	186	Sunk
16 May 1917	Patricio	Spain	2,164	Damaged
17 May 1917	Alfonso	Italy	230	Sunk
19 May 1917	Mardinian	United Kingdom	3,322	Sunk
20 May 1917	Caspian	United Kingdom	3,606	Sunk
21 May 1917	Saint Michel	France	175	Sunk
28 June 1917	Minerve	France	723	Sunk
30 June 1917	Mont Viso	France	4,820	Sunk
3 July 1917	Marthe Roux	France	1,962	Sunk
4 July 1917	Fratelli Bianchi	Italy	3,542	Sunk
7 July 1917	Wilberforce	United Kingdom	3,074	Sunk
12 July 1917	Ondine	France	84	Sunk
2 December 1917	Berwick Law	United Kingdom	4,680	Sunk
2 December 1917	Minas	Greece	2,506	Sunk
6 December 1917	Ilvington Court	United Kingdom	4,217	Sunk
12 December 1917	Emanuele C.	Italy	284	Sunk
28 January 1918	Djibouti	France	4,305	Sunk
30 January 1918	Maizar	United Kingdom	7,293	Sunk
6 February 1918	Ville De Verdun	France	4,576	Sunk
12 April 1918	Autolycus	United Kingdom	5,806	Sunk
12 April 1918	Moyune	United Kingdom	4,935	Sunk
19 April 1918	Elka	Greece	2,128	Sunk
19 April 1918	Lord Charlemont	United Kingdom	3,209	Sunk
22 April 1918	Dronning Maud	United Kingdom	2,663	Sunk
28 August 1918	Emilia G.	Italy	246	Sunk
28 August 1918	Johanne	Denmark	234	Sunk
4 September 1918	Richard	Norway	175	Sunk
9 September 1918	Policastra	United Kingdom	4,594	Damaged
9 September 1918	War Arabis	United Kingdom	5,183	Sunk

== Bibliography ==
- Gröner, Erich; Jung, Dieter; Maass, Martin (1991). U-boats and Mine Warfare Vessels. German Warships 1815–1945. Vol. 2. Translated by Thomas, Keith; Magowan, Rachel. London: Conway Maritime Press. ISBN 0-85177-593-4.
