= German submarine U-29 =

U-29 may refer to one of the following German submarines:

- SM U-29 (Germany), was a Type U 27 submarine launched in 1913 and that served in the First World War until sunk by HMS Dreadnought on 18 March 1915, the only submarine to be sunken by a battleship
  - During the First World War, Germany also had these submarines with similar names:
    - SM UB-29, a Type UB II submarine launched in 1916 and sunk on 13 December 1916
    - SM UC-29, a Type UC II submarine launched in 1916 and sunk on 7 June 1917
- German submarine U-29 (1936), a Type VIIA submarine that served in the Second World War until scuttled on 4 May 1945
- German submarine U-29 (S178), a Type 206 submarine of the Bundesmarine that was launched in 1974 and decommissioned in 2004
