= Marion Lightbody =

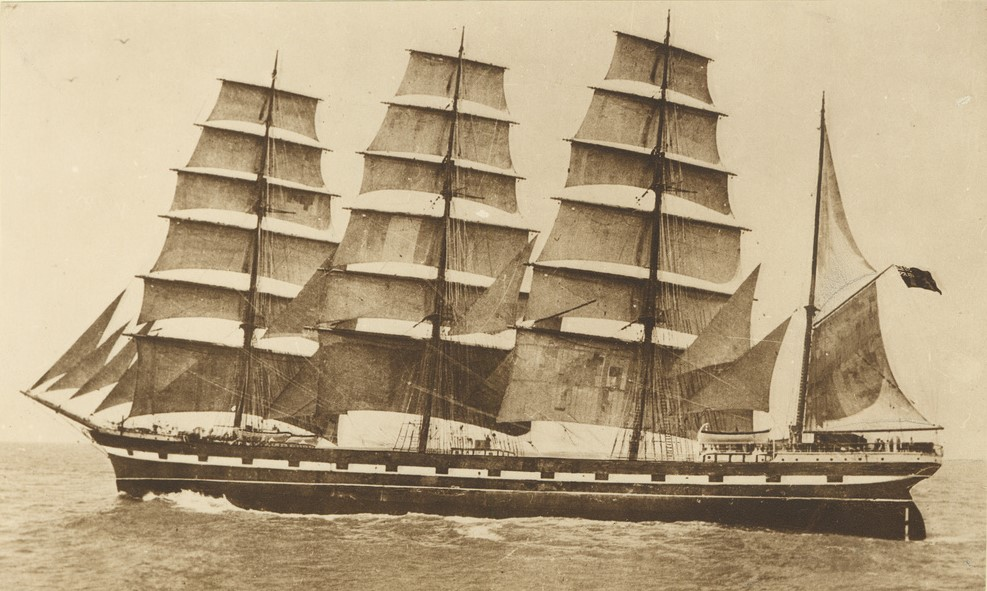
- SV Marion Lightbody while under sail.

History
- Name: Marion Lightbody
- Port of registry: Turku, Russian Empire
- Builder: Henderson D. & W. & Co. Ltd.
- Yard number: 334
- Launched: 17 April 1888
- Completed: 1888
- In service: 1888
- Out of service: 8 July 1915
- Identification: TGPQ
- Fate: Torpedoed and sunk

General characteristics
- Type: Full-rigged ship
- Tonnage: 2,242 GRT
- Length: 88 m (288 ft 9 in)
- Beam: 13 m (42 ft 8 in)
- Depth: 7.3 m (23 ft 11 in)
- Propulsion: 4 masts
- Crew: 25

SV Marion Lightbody was a Russian full-rigged ship that was torpedoed by the Imperial German submarine U-20 in the Atlantic Ocean near the Fastnet Rock on 8 July 1915 while she was travelling from Valparaíso, Chile to Queenstown, Ireland while carrying a cargo of barley.

== Construction ==
Marion Lightbody was launched on 17 April 1888 and completed the same year at the Henderson D. & W. & Co. Ltd. shipyard in Meadowside, United Kingdom. The ship was 88 metres (288 ft 9 in) long, had a beam of 13 metres (42 ft 8 in) and had a depth of 7.3 metres (23 ft 11 in). She was assessed at 2,242 gross register tons (GRT) and had four masts.

== Sinking ==
Marion Lightbody was travelling from Valparaíso, Chile to Queenstown, Ireland while carrying a cargo of barley when on 8 July 1915, she was torpedoed by the Imperial German submarine U-20 in the Atlantic Ocean near the Fastnet Rock, just over a month after the same submarine had torpedoed and sunk the RMS Lusitania in the same vicinity. The 25 crewmen escaped the ship in a dinghy and were later picked up by a British patrol boat before being brought to Queenstown.
