= SM U-12 (Germany) =

Coordinates: 56°04′30″N 02°18′00″W

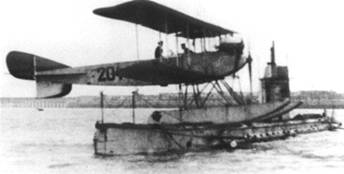
- SM U-12 with seaplane on deck

History

German Empire
- Name: U-12
- Ordered: 15 July 1908
- Builder: Kaiserliche Werft Danzig
- Cost: 2,140,000 Goldmark
- Yard number: 7
- Launched: 6 May 1910
- Commissioned: 13 August 1911
- Fate: Sunk 10 March 1915 off Eyemouth, Scotland

General characteristics
- Class & type: Type U 9 submarine
- Displacement: 493 t (485 long tons) surfaced; 611 t (601 long tons) submerged
- Length: 57.38 m (188 ft 3 in)
- Beam: 6 m (19 ft 8 in)
- Draught: 3.13 m (10 ft 3 in)
- Installed power: 2 × Körting 6-cylinder and 2 × Körting 8-cylinder two stroke paraffin motors with 900 PS (660 kW; 890 shp); 2 × SSW electric motors with 1,040 PS (760 kW; 1,030 shp); 550 rpm surfaced; 600 rpm submerged
- Propulsion: 2 shafts
- Speed: 14.2 knots (26.3 km/h; 16.3 mph) surfaced; 8.1 knots (15.0 km/h; 9.3 mph) submerged
- Range: 1,800 nmi (3,300 km; 2,100 mi) at 14 knots (26 km/h; 16 mph)
- Test depth: 50 m (160 ft)
- Boats & landing craft carried: 1 dinghy
- Complement: 4 officers, 25 men
- Armament: 4 × 45 cm (17.7 in) torpedo tubes (2 each bow and stern) with 6 torpedoes; 1 × 3.7 cm (1.5 in) Hotchkiss gun

Service record
- Part of: I Flotilla; 1 August 1914 – 10 March 1915
- Commanders: Kptlt. Walter Forstmann; 1 August 1914 – 9 February 1915; Kptlt. Hans Kratzsch; 10 February 1915 – 10 March 1915
- Operations: 4 patrols
- Victories: 1 merchant ship sunk (1,005 GRT); 1 warship sunk (810 tons)

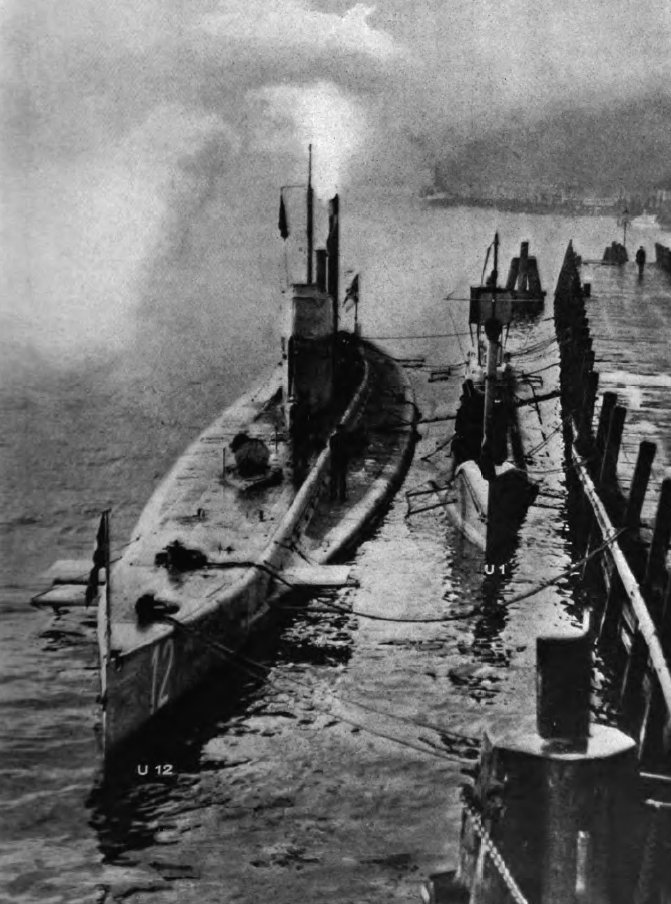
Submarine U-12 on left

SM U-12 was a German submarine, built in 1911 and sunk off Scotland in 1915. It was the first submarine to launch a plane at sea. U-12 was a Type U 9 U-boat built for the Imperial German Navy. Her construction was ordered on 15 July 1908 and her keel was laid down by Kaiserliche Werft in Danzig. She was launched on 6 May 1910 and commissioned on 13 August 1911.

The German Empire was the first nation to experiment with submarine aircraft carriers. Oberleutnant zur See Friedrich von Arnauld de la Perière of the Naval Air Service and U-12's commander, Kapitanleutnant Walther Forstmann, theorised that they could increase the range of their seaplanes by carrying the aircraft out to sea on the deck of submarine and launching the seaplanes after the sub partially submerged, allowing the plane to float off.

== Service history ==
At the star of World War I, U-12 formed part of I submarine Flotilla. Forstmann commanded the boat for the first year of the war. U-12 torpedoed the British gunboat HMS Niger off of Deal on 11 November 1914. This was the first Allied casualty from submarines based in Belgian ports.

On 6 January 1915 U-12 left Zeebrugge transporting a Friedrichshafen FF.29 seaplane on its deck. Once beyond the safety of the breakwater, Forstmann realised that the heavy swell might swamp the aircraft and ordered the immediate launch of the seaplane. He flooded the forward tanks and Arnauld floated the seaplane off the deck and took off from the sea. The plane flew along the English coastline undetected and returned safely to Zeebrugge.

=== Fate ===
In February 1915 command of U-12 passed to Kapitänleutnant Hans Kratzsch, with Forstmann moving to take over command of the newly commissioned U-39. The boat sank the British steamer Aberdon on 9 March off of St Abb's Head. The following day U-12 was hunted down by three Royal Navy destroyers, HMS Ariel, HMS Acheron, and HMS Attack.

The submarine attempted to dive, but was rammed by Ariel before being shelled by Acheron and Attack. It sank with the loss of 19 lives, although 10 survivors were rescued.

=== Wrecksite ===
In January 2008, divers Jim MacLeod, of Bo'ness, and Martin Sinclair, from Falkirk, found the wreckage of U-12 about 25 miles from Eyemouth after a five-year search.

== Summary of raiding history ==
U-12 sank two ships during its career.

Date	Ship name	Nationality	Tonnage (Note: Merchant ship tonnages are in gross register tons. Military vessels are listed by tons displacement.)	Fate
11 November 1914	HMS Niger	Royal Navy	810	Sunk
9 March 1915	Aberdon	United Kingdom	1,005	Sunk

== Bibliography ==
- Gröner, Erich; Jung, Dieter; Maass, Martin (1991). U-boats and Mine Warfare Vessels. German Warships 1815–1945. Vol. 2. Translated by Thomas, Keith; Magowan, Rachel. London: Conway Maritime Press. ISBN 0-85177-593-4.
- Rössler, Eberhard (1985). Die deutschen U-Boote und ihre Werften: U-Bootbau bis Ende des 1. Weltkriegs, Konstruktionen für das Ausland und die Jahre 1935–1945 [The German Submarines and Their Shipyards: Submarine Construction Until the End of the First World War] (in German). Vol. I. Koblenz: Bernard & Graefe. ISBN 3-7637-5213-7.
- von Mantey, Eberhard (1933). Der Krieg zur See – Der Handelskrieg mit U-Booten (in German). Band 2 (Februar bis September 1915). Berlin: E. S. Mittler & Sohn. p. 38-40. (Der Verlust von „U 12”, Kaptlt. Kratzsch, am 10. 3. 15)
