= SS Bakio =

Spanish ship

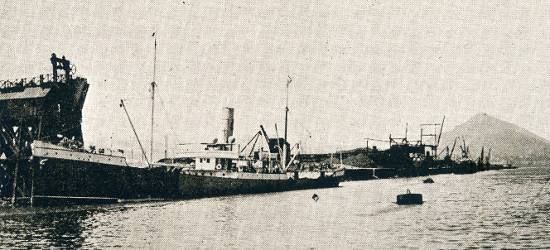
- Undated photo of Bakio.

History

Spain
- Name: Bakio
- Namesake: Bakio
- Owner: Naviera Sota y Aznar
- Builder: Campbeltown Shipbuilding Company
- Yard number: 71
- Completed: 1904
- In service: 1904–1916
- Fate: Sunk by SM U-20 on 30 April 1916

General characteristics
- Type: Steamer
- Tonnage: 1,906 tons
- Length: 86.1 m (282 ft 6 in)
- Beam: 12.2 m (40 ft 0 in)
- Draft: 6.1 m (20 ft 0 in)
- Propulsion: 1 x 3 cylinder triple expansion engine, single shaft, 1 screw

SS Bakio was a British-built steamship operated by the Spanish shipping company Naviera Sota y Aznar. The ship was built in 1904 and sunk on 30 April 1916 by German U-boat SM U-20, the same U-boat that sank the RMS Lusitania on 7 May 1915.

== Career ==
Bakio was built in 1904 by the Campbeltown Shipbuilding Company in Scotland and sold to the Spanish shipping company Naviera Sota y Aznar, based in Bilbao. The ship was last spotted on 29 April 1916 off the coast of Peniche, Portugal. The ship was traveling from Sagunto, Spain, to Montreal, Canada, carrying a cargo of iron ore. The ship was sunk on 30 April 1916 by German U-boat SM U-20 in the Atlantic Ocean after being struck by torpedoes. The site of the wreck has never been located.

The sinking of Bakio by U-20 seems to contradict the U-boat's sinking of the French schooner Bernadette the next day, 1 May 1916, south of Ireland. The schooner was sunk 700 miles (1,100 km) away from Bakio's last known location off Peniche, and at the U-boat's top speed of 15.4 knots (28.5 km/h; 17.7 mph), it would have taken just under 40 hours to travel from Bakio's last known location to where Bernadette was sunk.
