= SM U-28 (Germany) =

Type U 27 U-boat that served in WWI

Coordinates: 72°34′N 27°56′E

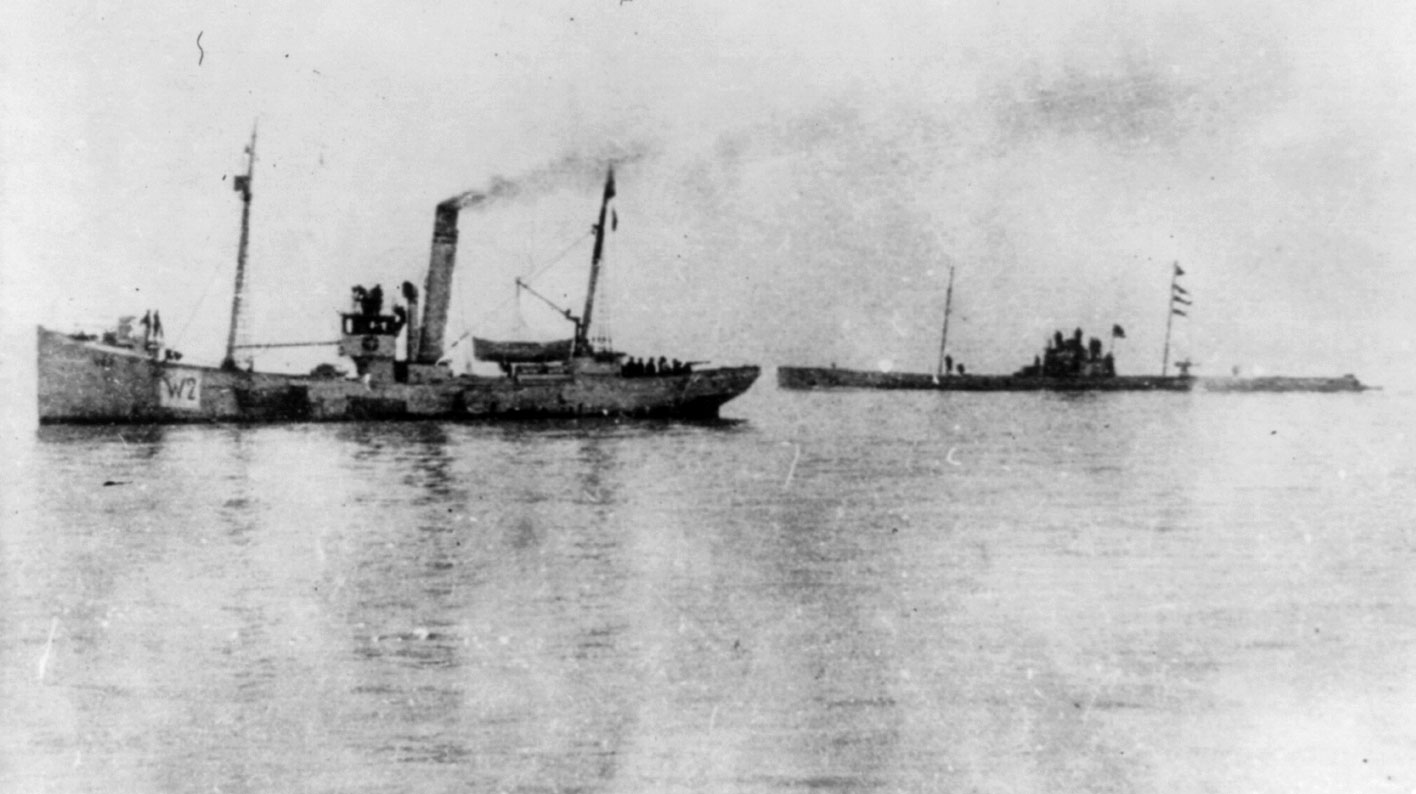
- SM U-28 seen from Batavier V, a ship she captured as a prize in March 1915.

History

German Empire
- Name: U-28
- Ordered: 19 February 1912
- Builder: Kaiserliche Werft, Danzig
- Yard number: 18
- Launched: 30 August 1913
- Commissioned: 26 June 1914
- Fate: Sunk 2 September 1917. 39 dead.

General characteristics
- Class & type: Type U 27 submarine
- Displacement: 675 t (664 long tons) surfaced; 878 t (864 long tons) submerged
- Length: 64.70 m (212 ft 3 in) (o/a)
- Beam: 6.32 m (20 ft 9 in)
- Draught: 3.48 m (11 ft 5 in)
- Speed: 16.7 knots (30.9 km/h; 19.2 mph) surfaced; 9.8 knots (18.1 km/h; 11.3 mph) submerged
- Range: 8,420 nmi (15,590 km; 9,690 mi) at 8 knots (15 km/h; 9.2 mph) surfaced; 85 nmi (157 km; 98 mi) at 5 knots (9.3 km/h; 5.8 mph) submerged
- Test depth: 50 m (164 ft)
- Complement: 4 officers, 31 enlisted
- Armament: 4 × 50 cm (19.7 in) torpedo tubes; 2 × 8.8 cm (3.5 in) SK L/30 deck gun

Service record
- Part of: IV Flotilla; 1 August 1914 - Unknown end; Training Flotilla; Unknown start – 10 May 1917; IV Flotilla; 10 May – 2 September 1917
- Commanders: Kptlt. Freiherr Georg-Günther von Forstner; 1 August 1914 – 14 June 1916; Kptlt. Otto Rohrbeck; 15 June – 4 August 1916; Kptlt. Freiherr von Loë-Degenhart; 5 August 1916 – 14 January 1917; Kptlt. Georg Schmidt; 15 January – 2 September 1917
- Operations: 5 patrols
- Victories: 39 merchant ships sunk (89,632 GRT); 1 auxiliary warship sunk (494 GRT); 3 merchant ships damaged (14,976 GRT); 2 merchant ships taken as prize (3,226 GRT)

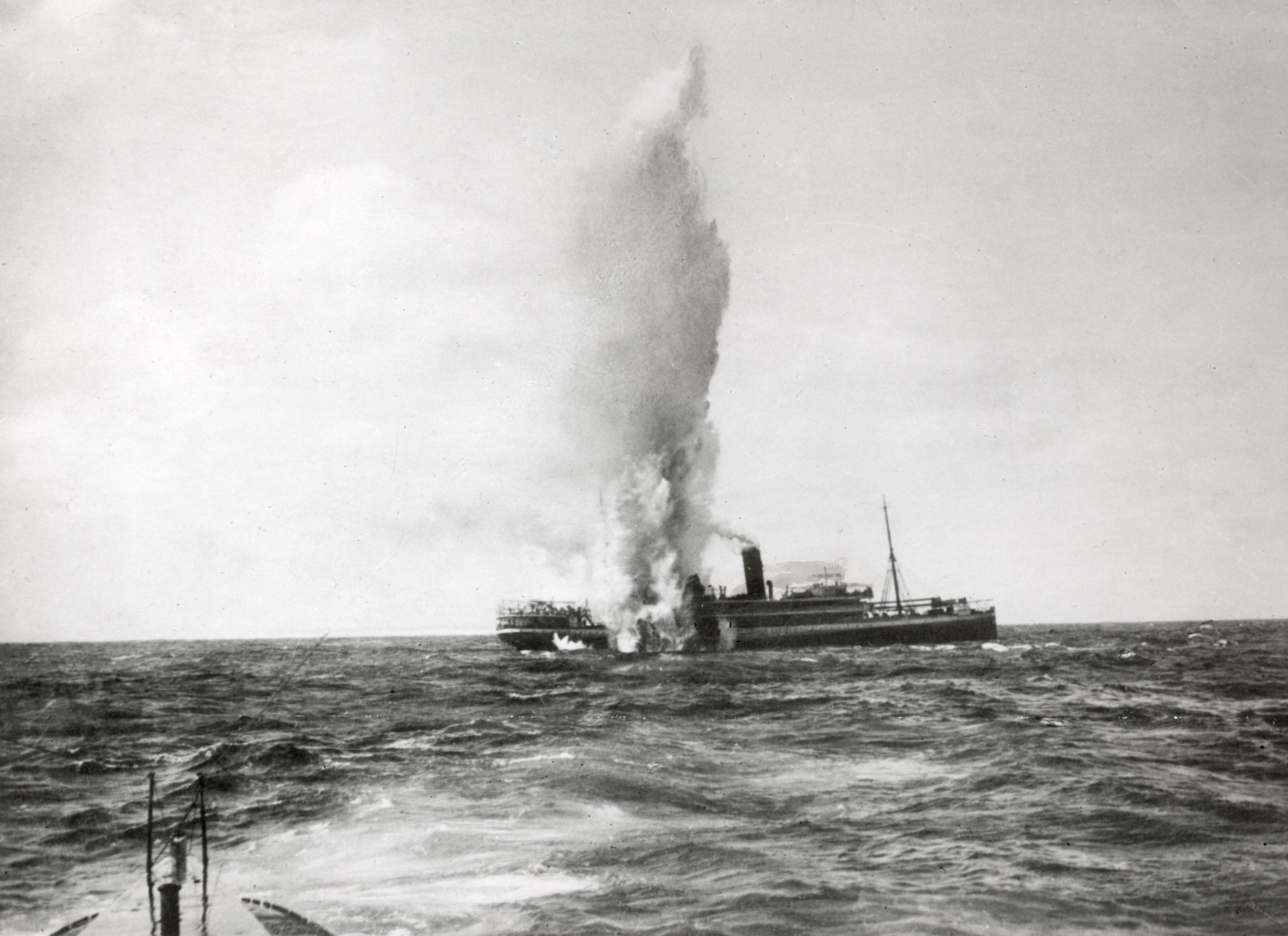
SM U-28 sinking the SS Falaba

SM U-28 (Note: "SM" stands for "Seiner Majestät" (English: His Majesty's) and combined with the U for Unterseeboot would be translated as His Majesty's Submarine.) was a Type U 27 U-boat that served in the First World War. It conducted 5 patrols, sinking 40 ships totalling 90,126 GRT.

== Career ==
U-28 was commissioned into the Imperial German Navy on 26 June 1914, with Freiherr Georg-Günther von Forstner (1882-1940) in command. Commander von Forstner was relieved on 15 June 1916 by Otto Rohrbeck, who was in turn relieved on 5 August by Freiherr von Loe-Degenhart. On 15 January 1917, Georg Schmidt took command.

On 30 July 1915, U-28 sank the British steamer Iberian. According to Commander von Forstner's account of the incident, the wreckage remained under the water for about 25 seconds until an explosion sent some of the debris flying up. It is said that along with the debris, a creature described as a "gigantic aquatic animal" resembling a crocodile was seen, which quickly disappeared from sight.

=== Sinking ===
U-28's final patrol began on 19 August 1917, when it departed from Emden for the Arctic Ocean. On 2 September, at 11:55 am, it encountered the armed English steamer Olive Branch, 85 nautical miles (157 km; 98 mi) north-by-northeast of North Cape, Norway. U-28 scored a torpedo hit, and closed in to finish the steamer with gunfire. The shells detonated Olive Branch's cargo of munitions, which it had been carrying from England to Arkhangelsk, Russia, and the subsequent explosion so badly damaged the nearby U-boat that it sank along with the steamer. All 39 of its crew were lost; some were seen swimming, but were not picked up by Olive Branch's lifeboats.

An alternative description of the event states that when the ammunition detonated, a truck carried as deck cargo was blown into the air and fell from a great height on the U-boat, sinking it.

=== Summary of raiding history ===
Date	Name	Nationality	Tonnage (Note: Tonnages are in gross register tons.)	Fate
17 March 1915	Leeuwarden	United Kingdom	990	Sunk
18 March 1915	Zaanstrom	Netherlands	1,657	Captured as prize
18 March 1915	Batavier V	Netherlands	1,569	Captured as prize
25 March 1915	Medea	Netherlands	1,235	Sunk
27 March 1915	Aguila	United Kingdom	2,114	Sunk
27 March 1915	South Point	United Kingdom	3,837	Sunk
27 March 1915	Vosges	United Kingdom	1,295	Sunk
28 March 1915	Falaba	United Kingdom	4,806	Sunk
28 March 1915	City Of Cambridge	United Kingdom	3,788	Damaged
29 March 1915	Flaminian	United Kingdom	3,500	Sunk
29 March 1915	Theseus	United Kingdom	6,723	Damaged
30 March 1915	Crown of Castile	United Kingdom	4,505	Sunk
30 July 1915	Iberian	United Kingdom	5,223	Sunk
31 July 1915	Nugget	United Kingdom	405	Sunk
31 July 1915	Turquoise	United Kingdom	486	Sunk
1 August 1915	Benvorlich	United Kingdom	3,381	Sunk
1 August 1915	Clintonia	United Kingdom	3,830	Sunk
1 August 1915	Koophandel	Belgium	1,736	Sunk
1 August 1915	Ranza	United Kingdom	2,320	Sunk
2 August 1915	HMS Portia	Royal Navy	494	Sunk
3 August 1915	Costello	United Kingdom	1,591	Sunk
4 August 1915	Midland Queen	Canada	1,993	Sunk
26 March 1916	Norne	Norway	1,224	Sunk
28 March 1916	Rio Tiete	United Kingdom	3,042	Sunk
30 March 1916	Trewyn	United Kingdom	3,084	Sunk
30 March 1916	Saint Hubert	France	232	Sunk
31 March 1916	Vigo	Spain	1,137	Sunk
1 April 1916	Bengairn	United Kingdom	2,127	Sunk
29 May 1917	Fridtjof Nansen	Norway	2,190	Sunk
29 May 1917	Karna	Norway	210	Sunk
29 May 1917	Kodan	Norway	217	Sunk
3 June 1917	Merioneth	United Kingdom	3,004	Sunk
4 June 1917	Algol	Russia	2,088	Sunk
5 June 1917	Alaska	Norway	90	Sunk
5 June 1917	Duen	Norway	30	Sunk
5 June 1917	Sydkap	Norway	40	Sunk
8 June 1917	Manchester Engineer	United Kingdom	4,465	Damaged
8 June 1917	Sverre II	Norway	44	Sunk
10 June 1917	Marie Elsie	United Kingdom	2,615	Sunk
10 June 1917	Perla	United Kingdom	5,355	Sunk
28 August 1917	Hidalgo	United Kingdom	4,271	Sunk
28 August 1917	Whitecourt	United Kingdom	3,680	Sunk
28 August 1917	Marselieza	Russia	3,568	Sunk
1 September 1917	Dront	Russia	3,488	Sunk
2 September 1917	Olive Branch	United Kingdom	4,649	Sunk

== See also ==
- SM UB-85

== Bibliography ==
- Gröner, Erich; Jung, Dieter; Maass, Martin (1991). German Warships 1815–1945, U-boats and Mine Warfare Vessels. Vol. 2. Translated by Thomas, Keith; Magowan, Rachel. London: Conway Maritime Press. ISBN 0-85177-593-4.
