= SS Tokomaru =

British cargo ship

History

United Kingdom
- Name: Westmeath (1893–1894); Tokomaru (1894–1915)
- Namesake: County Westmeath; Maori migrant canoe
- Owner: Ralph M Hudson (1893–1894); Shaw, Savill & Albion Line(1894–1915)
- Builder: Swan Hunter, Wallsend
- Yard number: 182
- Launched: 15 May 1893
- Sponsored by: Miss Freda Hudson
- Completed: July 1893
- Out of service: 30 January 1915
- Homeport: Sunderland (1893–1894); Southampton (1894–1915)
- Identification: UK Official Number 99624; Call sign NCSL
- Fate: Torpedoed, 30 January 1915

General characteristics
- Type: Cargo ship
- Tonnage: as built; 6,120 GRT; 3,987 NRT; 8,700 DWT
- Length: 425.0 ft (129.5 m)
- Beam: 53.2 ft (16.2 m)
- Depth of hold: 31.1 ft (9.5 m)
- Installed power: 521 Nhp
- Propulsion: Wallsend Slipway & Engineering Company 3-cylinder triple expansion
- Speed: 11 knots (13 mph; 20 km/h)

SS Tokomaru was a British steam cargo ship built in 1893 as Westmeath by Swan Hunter of Wallsend for a Sunderland shipowner. The steamer was sold the following year to the Shaw, Savill & Albion Line, renamed Tokomaru, and converted to a refrigerated ship for their New Zealand and Australian routes. In January 1915 the ship was torpedoed and sank off Le Havre, France.

== Specifications ==
As built, Westmeath's length was 425.0 ft (129.5 m), its beam was 53.2 ft (16.2 m) and its depth was 31.1 ft (9.5 m); it measured 6,120 GRT and 3,987 NRT. The hull was of the spar deck design, with a cargo deadweight of about 8700 tons in addition to 2250 tons of coal fuel.

The ship was powered by a triple expansion steam engine, built by The Wallsend Slipway and Engineering Company Ltd of Newcastle upon Tyne, and with a single four-bladed propeller. The engine, supplied by three double-ended boilers, was rated at 600 nhp, giving a service speed of 11 knots (13 mph; 20 km/h).

== History ==
Westmeath was launched on 15 May 1893 by the shipbuilders C. S. Swan & Hunter of Newcastle, England for Ralph M. Hudson (R. M. Hudson & Sons), Sunderland and named by Miss Freda Hudson. The ship was registered at the port of Sunderland and allocated code letters N.C.S.L. as well as British official number 99624. On 22 July 1893 Westmeath sailed from Sunderland on its maiden voyage to New Caledonia, New Zealand and Australia, with a complement of 46, together with a few passengers. On a subsequent voyage, from Glasgow for Bombay with a cargo of coal, the steamer collided off the Isle of Arran on 22 February 1894 with the Norwegian barque Prindsesse Louise, which was heavily damaged, went ashore and was subsequently condemned.

In September 1894 Westmeath was sold to the Shaw, Savill & Albion Line and renamed Tokomaru. The ship was sent back to her original builders for extensive alterations, including being fitted with refrigerated holds with capacity for some 94,000 frozen sheep, and increased accommodation for 3rd and steerage class passengers. As a consequence of these changes, the depth of hold was revised to 23.6 ft (7.2 m) and the tonnages to 6,238 GRT and 4,072 NRT. (Note: In 1913 the vessel's official tonnages were revised to 6,084 GRT and 3,912 NRT) The ship subsequently operated with an average complement of 61.

Tokomaru made her first departure to New Zealand for Shaw Savill from London on 29 November 1894 and usually made two round trips per year. On 22 September 1897, en route from Wellington, New Zealand to London with frozen meat, the ship's tail shaft broke in mid-South Atlantic, leaving the propeller hanging loose. With considerable ingenuity and in some danger and discomfort the engineers were able to access the break, fabricate a coupling and draw the shaft together sufficient for Tokomaru to steam 500 miles to Rio de Janeiro. After further temporary repairs the ship returned safely to London, despite gales in the Bay of Biscay. The ship's underwriters recognised this as a remarkable achievement with a special award of 850 guineas (£935 sterling) to the captain, chief engineer (who both also received the Lloyd's Medal for Meritorious Service) and crew.

=== Sinking ===
Tokomaru was on a voyage from Wellington, Montevideo and Tenerife with frozen meat for Le Havre, fruit and vegetables for London, as well as a consignment of used clothing donated for relief in Belgium. By 0850hrs on 30 January 1915 the ship was off Cap d'Antifer, about 7 miles west-northwest of Le Havre, when it was torpedoed without warning by the German submarine SM U-20. The torpedo struck Tokomaru amidships on the port side causing an immediate heavy list, but the crew of 58 were able to take to three of the ship's lifeboats, after a radio SOS had been sent.

Semper, a Boulogne trawler serving as a minesweeper and already in the area, rescued the crew from the boats. In addition the emergency radio signal brought six French Navy torpedo boats out from port. Tokomaru finally sank one hour and 40 minutes after the attack.
