= SM U-20 (Germany) =

German U-Boat – torpedoed RMS Lusitania in 1915

Coordinates: 56°35′00″N 08°07′50″E

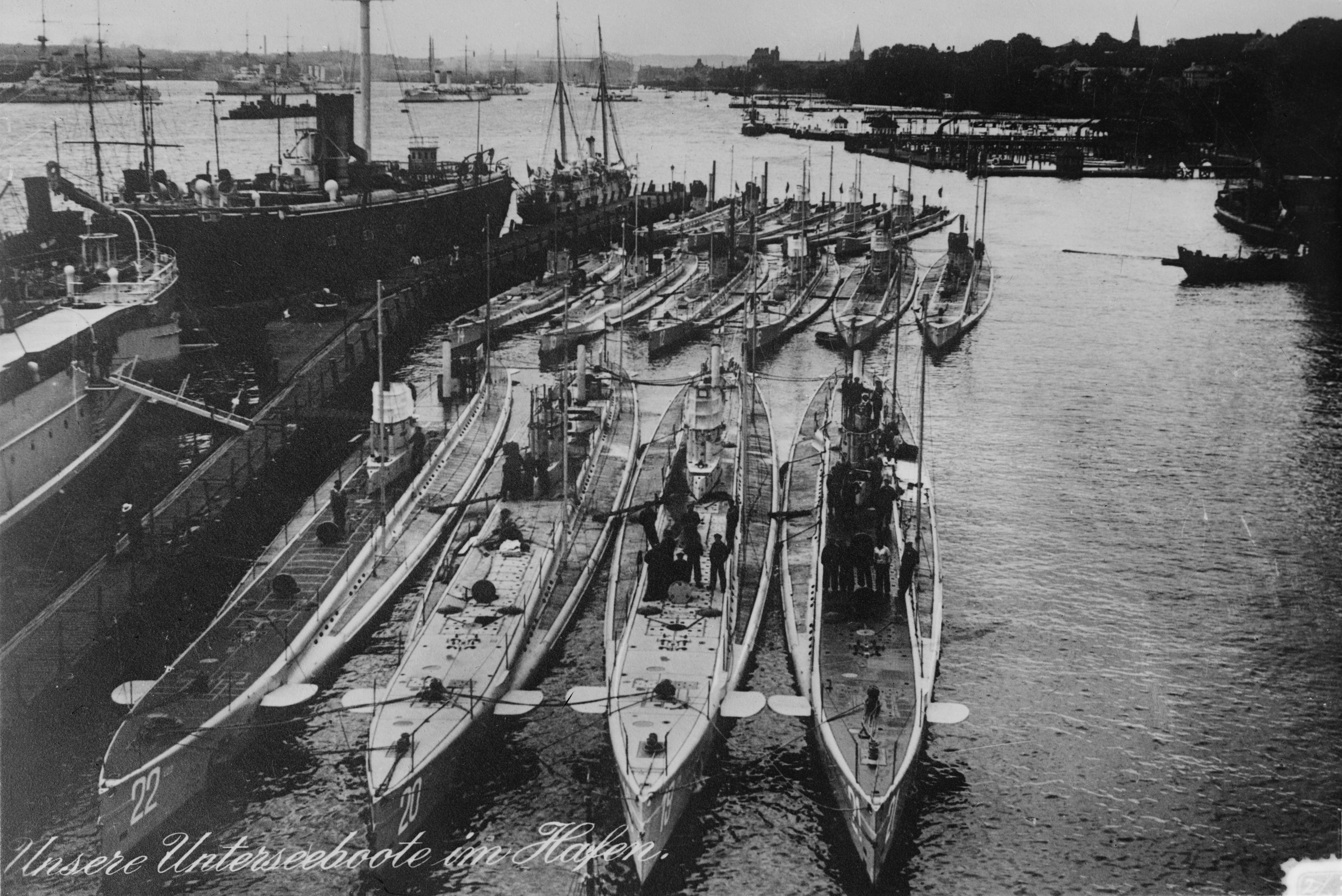
- U-20 (second from left) in Kiel harbour, 1914

History

Germany
- Name: U-20
- Ordered: 25 November 1910
- Builder: Kaiserliche Werft Danzig
- Cost: 2,450,000 Goldmark
- Yard number: 14
- Laid down: 7 November 1911
- Launched: 18 December 1912
- Commissioned: 5 August 1913
- Fate: Grounded 4 November 1916 and destroyed by her crew the next day.

General characteristics
- Class & type: Type U 19 submarine
- Displacement: 650 t (640 long tons) surfaced; 837 t (824 long tons) submerged
- Length: 64.15 m (210 ft 6 in)
- Beam: 6.10 m (20 ft)
- Height: 7.30 m (23 ft 11 in)
- Draught: 3.58 m (11 ft 9 in)
- Propulsion: 2 shafts; 2 × MAN 8-cylinder two stroke diesel motors with 1,700 PS (1,250 kW; 1,680 shp); 2 × AEG double Motordynamos with 1,200 PS (880 kW; 1,180 shp); 320 rpm submerged
- Speed: 15.4 knots (28.5 km/h; 17.7 mph) surfaced; 9.5 knots (17.6 km/h; 10.9 mph) submerged
- Range: 9,700 nautical miles (18,000 km; 11,200 mi) at 8 kn surfaced; 80 nautical miles (150 km; 92 mi) at 5 kn submerged
- Test depth: 50 m (164 ft 1 in)
- Complement: 4 officers, 31 men
- Armament: 4 × 50 cm (19.7 in) torpedo tubes (2 each bow and stern) with 6 torpedoes; 1 × 8.8 cm (3.5 in) SK L/30 gun (from 1916 2 ×)

Service record
- Part of: III Flotilla; 1 August 1914 – 4 November 1916
- Commanders: Kptlt. Otto Dröscher; 5 August 1913 – 15 December 1914; Kptlt. Walther Schwieger; 16 December 1914 – 5 November 1916
- Operations: 7 patrols
- Victories: 37 merchant ships sunk (145,830 GRT); 1 merchant ship damaged (2,246 GRT); 1 warship damaged (397 tons)

SM U-20 (Note: "SM" stands for "Seiner Majestät" (English: His Majesty's) and combined with the U for Unterseeboot would be translated as His Majesty's Submarine.) was a German Type U 19 U-boat built for service in the Imperial German Navy. She was launched on 18 December 1912, and commissioned on 5 August 1913. During World War I, she took part in operations around the British Isles. U-20 became infamous following her sinking of the British ocean liner RMS Lusitania on 7 May 1915, an act that dramatically reshaped the course of the First World War.

== Career ==
On 7 May 1915, U-20 was patrolling off the southern coast of Ireland under the command of Kapitänleutnant Walther Schwieger. Three months earlier, on 4 February, the Germans had established a U-boat blockade around the British Isles and had declared any vessel in it a legitimate target. At about 13:40 Schwieger was at the periscope and saw a vessel approaching. From a distance of about 700 m (770 yd), Schwieger noted she had four funnels and two masts, making her a passenger liner and he fired a torpedo. It hit on the starboard side, almost directly below the bridge. Schwieger wrote that he was surprised by the size of the explosion, reasoning that a second explosion must have happened, possibly caused by coal dust, a boiler explosion or powder. According to his logs, only then did he recognise her as Lusitania, a vessel in the British Fleet Reserve. In 18 minutes, Lusitania sank with 1,197 casualties. The wreck lies in 300 ft (91 m) of water.

Fifteen minutes after he had fired his torpedo, Schwieger noted in his war diary,

It looks as if the ship will stay afloat only for a very short time. [I gave order to] dive to 25 metres (82 ft) and leave the area seawards. I couldn't have fired another torpedo into this mass of humans desperately trying to save themselves.

There was at the time a great controversy about the sinking, over whether Lusitania was armed, carrying troops or illegal explosives to England and over Schwieger's method of attack. The Allies and the United States originally thought the U-20 fired two torpedoes. Postwar investigations showed only one was fired.

Before Schwieger got back to the docks at Wilhelmshaven for refuelling and supplies, the United States had formally protested to Berlin against the brutality of his action. Kaiser Wilhelm II wrote in the margins of the American note, "Utterly impertinent", "outrageous" and "this is the most insolent thing in tone and bearing that I have had to read since the Japanese note last August". To keep America out of the war, in June the Kaiser was compelled to rescind unrestricted submarine warfare and require all passenger liners be left unmolested. On 4 September 1915 Schwieger was back at sea with U-20, 85 nmi (157 km; 98 mi) off the Fastnet Rock in the south Irish Sea. This rock held one of the key navigational markers in the western ocean, the Fastnet Lighthouse, and any ships passing in and out of the Irish Sea would be within visual contact of it.

RMS Hesperian was beginning a run outward bound from Liverpool to Quebec and Montreal, with a general cargo, also doubling as a hospital ship, and carrying about 800 passengers when she was attacked and sunk by U-20 off the Fastnet.

Only a few days before, Count Bernsdorff, the German Ambassador, had assured the United States government that passenger liners will not be sunk without warning and without ensuring the safety of the non-combatants aboard providing that the liners do not try to escape or offer resistance.

— Archibald Hurd

Schwieger was reprimanded by the Admiralty but was unrepentant. The Germans decided to report that the ship was hit by a mine.

== Fate and legacy ==
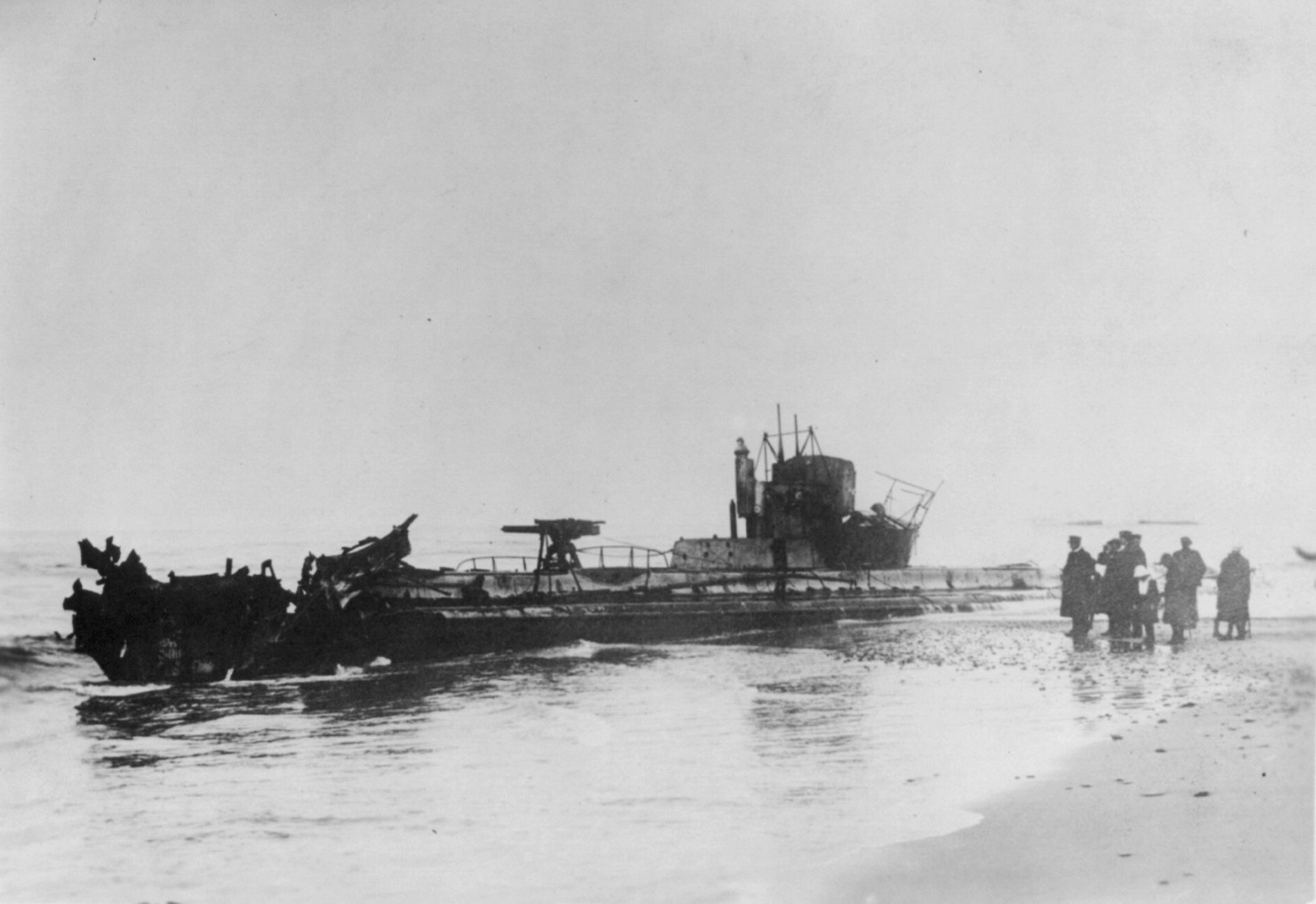
U-20 grounded on the Danish coast in 1916. Torpedoes had been exploded in the bow to destroy the boat

On 4 November 1916, U-20 grounded on the Danish coast south of Vrist, a little north of Thorsminde after suffering damage to its engines. Her crew attempted to destroy her with explosives the following day, succeeding only in damaging the boat's bow but making it inoperative as a warship. U-20 remained on the beach until 1925 when the Danish government blew it up in a "spectacular explosion". The Danish navy removed the deck gun and made it unserviceable by cutting holes in vital parts. The gun was kept in the naval stores at Holmen in Copenhagen for almost 80 years. The conning tower was removed and placed on the front lawn of the local museum Strandingsmuseum St. George Thorsminde, it is now exhibited in the Sea War Museum, Jutland, along with the original periscope. The novelist Clive Cussler claimed his National Underwater and Marine Agency (NUMA) located the remains of U-20 in 1984, about 400 yd (370 m) from shore.

== Summary of raiding history ==
U20 successes
| Date | Name | Nationality | GRT | Fate |
|---|---|---|---|---|
| 30 January 1915 | Ikaria | United Kingdom | 4,335 | Sunk |
| 30 January 1915 | Oriole | United Kingdom | 1,489 | Sunk |
| 30 January 1915 | Tokomaru | United Kingdom | 6,084 | Sunk |
| 7 March 1915 | Bengrove | United Kingdom | 3,840 | Sunk |
| 9 March 1915 | Princess Victoria | United Kingdom | 1,108 | Sunk |
| 11 March 1915 | Florazan | United Kingdom | 4,658 | Sunk |
| 5 May 1915 | Earl of Lathom | United Kingdom | 132 | Sunk |
| 6 May 1915 | Candidate | United Kingdom | 5,858 | Sunk |
| 6 May 1915 | Centurion | United Kingdom | 5,495 | Sunk |
| 7 May 1915 | Lusitania | United Kingdom | 30,396 | Sunk |
| 8 July 1915 | Marion Lightbody | Russia | 2,176 | Sunk |
| 9 July 1915 | Ellesmere | United Kingdom | 1,170 | Sunk |
| 9 July 1915 | Leo | Russia | 2,224 | Sunk |
| 9 July 1915 | Meadowfield | United Kingdom | 2,750 | Sunk |
| 13 July 1915 | Lennok | Russia | 1,142 | Sunk |
| 2 September 1915 | Roumanie | United Kingdom | 2,599 | Sunk |
| 3 September 1915 | Frode | Denmark | 1,875 | Sunk |
| 4 September 1915 | Hesperian | United Kingdom | 10,920 | Sunk |
| 5 September 1915 | Dictator | United Kingdom | 4,116 | Sunk |
| 5 September 1915 | Douro | United Kingdom | 1,604 | Sunk |
| 5 September 1915 | Rhea | Russia | 1,145 | Sunk |
| 6 September 1915 | Guatemala | France | 5,913 | Sunk |
| 7 September 1915 | Bordeaux | France | 4,604 | Sunk |
| 7 September 1915 | Caroni | United Kingdom | 2,652 | Sunk |
| 8 September 1915 | Mora | United Kingdom | 3,047 | Sunk |
| 30 April 1916 | Bakio | Spain | 1,906 | Sunk |
| 1 May 1916 | Bernadette | France | 486 | Sunk |
| 2 May 1916 | Ruabon | United Kingdom | 2,004 | Sunk |
| 3 May 1916 | Marie Molinos | France | 1,946 | Sunk |
| 6 May 1916 | Galgate | United Kingdom | 2,356 | Sunk |
| 8 May 1916 | Cymric | United Kingdom | 13,370 | Sunk |
| 1 August 1916 | Aaro | United Kingdom | 2,603 | Sunk |
| 29 August 1916 | Ibo | Portuguese Navy | 397 | Damaged |
| 26 September 1916 | Thelma | United Kingdom | 1,002 | Sunk |
| 18 October 1916 | Ethel Duncan | United Kingdom | 2,510 | Sunk |
| 23 October 1916 | Arromanches | France | 1,640 | Sunk |
| 23 October 1916 | Chieri | Italy | 4,400 | Sunk |
| 23 October 1916 | Felix Louis | France | 275 | Sunk |
| 26 October 1916 | Fabian | United Kingdom | 2,246 | Damaged |

== See also ==
- Room 40

== Bibliography ==
- Bailey, Thomas A.; Ryan, Paul B. (1975). The Lusitania Disaster: An Episode in Modern Warfare and Diplomacy. New York/London: Free Press/Collier Macmillan.
- Gröner, Erich; Jung, Dieter; Maass, Martin (1991). German Warships 1815–1945, U-boats and Mine Warfare Vessels. Vol. 2. Translated by Thomas, Keith; Magowan, Rachel. London: Conway Maritime Press. ISBN 0-85177-593-4.
- Spindler, Arno (1966) [1932]. Der Handelskrieg mit U-Booten. 5 Vols. Berlin: Mittler & Sohn. Vols. 4+5, dealing with 1917+18, are very hard to find: Guildhall Library, London, has them all, also Vol. 1-3 in an English translation: The submarine war against commerce.
- Beesly, Patrick (1982). Room 40: British Naval Intelligence 1914–1918. London: H Hamilton. ISBN 978-0241108642.
- Halpern, Paul G. (1995). A Naval History of World War I. New York: Routledge. ISBN 978-1857284980.
- Roessler, Eberhard (1997). Die Unterseeboote der Kaiserlichen Marine. Bonn: Bernard & Graefe. ISBN 978-3763759637.
- Schroeder, Joachim (2002). Die U-Boote des Kaisers. Bonn: Bernard & Graefe. ISBN 978-3763762354.
- Koerver, Hans Joachim (2008). Room 40: German Naval Warfare 1914–1918. Vol I., The Fleet in Action. Steinbach: LIS Reinisch. ISBN 978-3-902433-76-3.
- Koerver, Hans Joachim (2009). Room 40: German Naval Warfare 1914–1918. Vol II., The Fleet in Being. Steinbach: LIS Reinisch. ISBN 978-3-902433-77-0.
