= SS Tellus (1911) =

History

Norway
- Name: Tellus (1911-April 1916); Elizabeth IV (April–September 1916)
- Namesake: Tellus
- Owner: A/S Wabanas Dampskibskompani (1911-1913); Wilhelm Wilhelmsen (1913-April 1916); A/S Elizabeth IV (April–September 1916)
- Operator: A/S Wabanas Dampskibskompani (1911-1913); Wilhelm Wilhelmsen (1913-April 1916); A/S Elizabeth IV (April–September 1916)
- Builder: William Doxford & Sons, Pallion
- Cost: NOK 1,125,165.39
- Yard number: 417
- Launched: 31 January 1911
- Christened: Tellus
- Commissioned: 8 March 1911
- Home port: Tønsberg
- Identification: Call sign MGKQ (1911-April 1916); Call sign WLFS (April–September 1916)
- Fate: Sunk, 8 September 1916

General characteristics
- Type: Cargo ship
- Tonnage: 7,395 GRT; 4,131 NRT; 12,925 DWT
- Length: 445 ft 0 in (135.64 m)
- Beam: 60 ft 0 in (18.29 m)
- Depth: 29 ft 2 in (8.89 m)
- Installed power: 412 Nhp
- Propulsion: William Doxford & Sons 3-cylinder triple expansion
- Speed: 10.0 knots

Tellus was a steam cargo ship built in 1911 by the William Doxford & Sons of Pallion for the Wabanas Dampskibskompani, a subsidiary of Nova Scotia Steel & Coal Company and managed by Wilhelm Wilhelmsen. She was named after Tellus, the Earth goddess.

== Design and construction ==
On 10 March 1911 it was reported that a new company "The Wabana Steamship Company" (Wabanas Dampskibskompani) with a capital of NOK 1,500,000 was registered in Nøtterøy with the purpose of transporting ore between Newfoundland and Europe. The new company was a subsidiary of the Nova Scotia Steel Company and was managed by Wilhelm Wilhelmsen. Two ships were leased to conduct the operations (SS Tellus and SS Themis) by the newly formed company for a period of 10 years.

The ship was laid down in 1910 at William Doxford & Sons shipyard in Pallion. The vessel was launched on 31 January 1911 (yard number 417), and the sea trials were held on 8 March 1911 with the ship being able to reach speed of 12.0 knots (13.8 mph; 22.2 km/h). After completion of her sea trials, the ship was delivered to her owner on the same day. On 10 March 1911 Tellus departed from Newcastle for Narvik where the ship was scheduled to take a load of iron ore for delivery to Philadelphia.

As built, the ship was 445 feet 0 inches (135.64 m) long (between perpendiculars) and 60 feet 0 inches (18.29 m) abeam, a mean draft of 29 feet 2 inches (8.89 m). Tellus was assessed at 7,395 GRT, 4,131 NRT and 12,925 DWT which made her the largest ship in Scandinavia at the time. The vessel had a steel hull, and a single 412 nhp triple-expansion steam engine, with cylinders of 27 1/2-inch (70 cm), 45 1/2-inch (116 cm), and 76-inch (190 cm) diameter with a 51-inch (130 cm) stroke, that drove a single screw propeller, and moved the ship at up to 10.0 knots (11.5 mph; 18.5 km/h).

== Operational history ==
After completion Tellus loaded 11,000 tons of Swedish iron ore from the Kiruna-Luossavaara mines in Narvik and departed for her maiden journey on 18 March 1911 to Philadelphia, arriving there on 6 April. The cargo was assigned to the Warwick Iron & Steel Co. of Pottstown. The vessel departed from Philadelphia on 6 May and proceeded to Wabana, a mining site for the Nova Scotia Steel Company. After loading iron ore in Newfoundland, the ship departed Wabana on 6 June for Rotterdam.

Tellus continued serving the Wabana-Rotterdam route through the end of 1913 during the open navigation period around Newfoundland, usually April through November. During winters, the ship was either chartered in North America to move iron ore from Wabana to Philadelphia, or to transport other cargo along the East Coast of the US, or was engaged in iron ore shipping from Narvik and Kirkenes area to Rotterdam.

The ship experienced several accidents throughout her career. During her March 1912 trip from Narvik to Philadelphia with a cargo of iron ore she ran into some ice fields and experienced rough weather throughout her journey, arriving in Philadelphia on 16 March with some damage about the decks. After unloading the ship continued on to Tampa where she took on 7,900 tons of phosphate rock and departed on 30 March for Hamburg. On 1 May Tellus grounded at the entrance to the Hamburg harbor but was able to get off with assistance of 4 tugs.

On 19 February 1913 she went into Trondheim with a propeller damage, sustained possibly after hitting a submerged wreck in the water. The work was challenging since due to the size of the ship she could not fit into drydock or even the repair yard. The ship's nose had to be submerged to expose the propeller which then could be changed with the use of the repair yard crane. The ship returned in service by mid-March.

On 17 November 1913 she departed Philadelphia for Rotterdam with the largest grain cargo transported by a ship at the time. She could only load half of her cargo at Girard Point and had to get the other half at Port Richmond. Her cargo measured 51,132 quarters or 450,000 bushels of wheat.

On 5 April 1914 Tellus again departed Rotterdam for Wabana. The journey took almost 4 weeks and the ship came into Wabana on 29 April, leaking and with a damaged propeller which were probably caused by a collision with an iceberg. The vessel proceeded to St John's next day to conduct emergency repairs.

After the start of World War I Tellus could no longer be involved in her ore trade, as the main consumer of her cargo was Germany. She became a tramp ship and was chartered for any cargo that she could carry. On 31 August 1914 Tellus departed Norfolk carrying 10,394 tons of coal as cargo and 2,486 tons in bunkers to Piraeus. From Piraeus the ship sailed to New York City via Almeria where together with other Wilhelm Wilhelmsen's ships she was chartered by Barber Line. The vessel loaded a cargo of food supplies and copper for an Italian customer and left New York on 20 November 1914. She had to stop at Gibraltar for a British inspection where the ship was ordered to unload all copper before being allowed to proceed to Genoa on 23 December.

After her return to New York in April 1915, Tellus went to South America, visiting ports of Montevideo and Buenos Aires before returning to Boston on 21 July 1915. Tellus departed New York for Vladivostok on 21 August 1915 with 11,500 tons of general cargo (most of it were military supplies for Russia), and passed through the Panama Canal on 2 September. The vessel called at Comox on 3 October to replenish her bunkers before departing in the early morning on 5 October, taking course to Muroran and from there on to Vladivostok. On her trip to Japan Tellus ran into several storms which severely slowed her down and depleted her coal reserves forcing the ship to call at Nemuro. After replenishing her coal bunkers, the ship left Nemuro early on 17 November heading to Muroran, but ran aground in stormy weather on Kaigara-jima sustaining significant damage to her bottom. Most of her cargo was unloaded and saved using lighters but due to the ship being stranded in isolated position she was not refloated until 22 January 1916 and towed to Hanasaki for repairs. Tellus then continued to Hakodate arriving there on 4 February 1916. After undergoing major repairs, the ship departed Hakodate on 28 March 1916, arriving at Shanghai on 2 April.

Sometime around April 1916 the ship was sold to Ole Wikborg, an owner of a marine insurance company Wikborgs Assuranceselskab based out of Drammen. The ship was renamed Elizabeth IV and after finishing repairs and transfer was chartered to transport sugar from East India to Europe. The ship loaded 11,173 tons of sugar in Pasuruan on Java and departed for Marseille on 28 July 1916. The ship was under command of Captain Henrik Berg and had a crew of 46 men. Elizabeth IV called at Colombo on 9 August, taking 1,400 tons coal in her bunkers, and transited through the Suez Canal on 31 August.

=== Sinking ===
Elizabeth IV sailed from Port Said around 18:30 on 31 August 1916 for the final leg of her trip to Marseille. On 6 September, around 11:00, she passed by Cape Bon, and observed three patrol boats that were thought to be British. At this point the course was changed to pass about 20 miles west of Sardinia's southern tip, and from there the course was to be set straight to Marseille. At around noon on 8 September 1916, in an approximate position 41°14′N 6°24′E, an unknown submarine (later to be determined to be German submarine U-34) was sighted on the vessel's portside. About 3 minutes later, the submarine hoisted an Austrian flag, and Captain Berg ordered an All Stop. About a minute later, a warning shot was fired from the submarine across the bow. Elizabeth IV came to a stop, and a boarding party from the submarine came on board. Once they learned the ship was heading to France, they ordered the crew to abandon ship, the lifeboats were lowered, the scuttling charges were placed on the ship's starboard side and were ignited. At around 13:45 the charges exploded, and the ship immediately began to list on her starboard side and sank bow first at 14:05. The crew was provided with directions on how to get to Capo Falcone on Sardinia, about 84 nautical miles (156 km) away. At around 16:00 the lifeboats were sighted by Greek steamer Petritzis, who took the crew on board and safely landed them at Savona in the morning of 10 September.
