= SS Glenartney (1911) =

Coordinates: 50°36′N 0°25′E

History

United Kingdom
- Name: Glenartney
- Namesake: Glen Artney, Perthshire
- Owner: Caledonia SS Co
- Operator: James Gardiner & Co
- Port of registry: Glasgow
- Builder: Charles Connell & Co, Whiteinch
- Yard number: 340
- Launched: 26 October 1911
- Completed: December 1911
- Identification: UK official number 132995; code letters HTWB
- Fate: Sunk by torpedo, 18 March 1915

General characteristics
- Type: Cargo ship
- Tonnage: 5,201 GRT, 3,309 NRT
- Length: 410.0 ft (125.0 m)
- Beam: 52.3 ft (15.9 m)
- Depth: 28.6 ft (8.7 m)
- Decks: 2
- Installed power: 536 NHP
- Propulsion: 1 × triple expansion steam engine; 1 × screw
- Notes: sister ship: Glenetive

SS Glenartney was a cargo steamship that was launched in Scotland in 1911 and sunk by a U-boat in the English Channel in 1918.

== Building ==
In 1911 Charles Connell & Co built a pair of cargo ships for the Caledonia Steamship Company. Glenetive was built at Scotstoun, launched on 22 August and completed that September. Her sister ship Glenartney was built at Whiteinch, launched on 26 October and completed that December.

Dunsmuir and Jackson of Govan, Glasgow built a three-cylinder triple expansion steam engine for each ship. Glenartney's engine was rated at 536 NHP.

Glenartney was registered in Glasgow, her UK official number was 132995 and her code letters were HTWB.

== Loss ==
In March 1915 Glenartney was en route from Bangkok to London with a cargo of rice and meal. On 18 March the Imperial German Navy U-boat U-34 torpedoed her about 4 nautical miles (7.4 km) south of the Royal Sovereign Lightship, killing one member of Glenartney's crew.

A torpedo boat rescued 39 survivors and landed them at Newhaven in England.
