= SM U-29 (Germany) =

Imperial German submarine (1914–1915)

Coordinates: 58°42′58.5″N 3°6′52.5″W

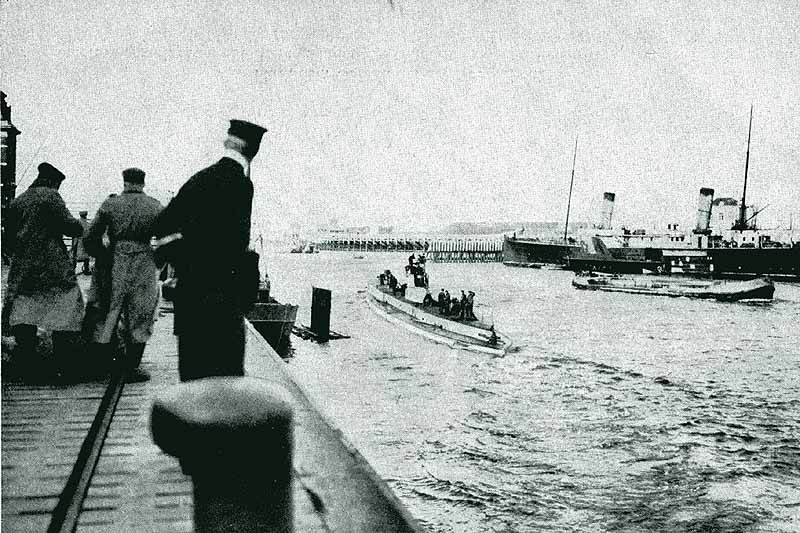
- SM U-29 leaving harbour

History

German Empire
- Name: U-29
- Ordered: 19 February 1912
- Builder: Kaiserliche Werft Danzig
- Yard number: 19
- Launched: 11 October 1913
- Commissioned: 1 August 1914
- Fate: Rammed and sunk on 18 March 1915

General characteristics
- Class & type: Type U 27 submarine
- Displacement: 675 t (664 long tons) surfaced; 878 t (864 long tons) submerged
- Length: 64.70 m (212 ft 3 in) (o/a)
- Beam: 6.32 m (20 ft 9 in)
- Draught: 3.48 m (11 ft 5 in)
- Speed: 16.7 knots (30.9 km/h; 19.2 mph) surfaced; 9.8 knots (18.1 km/h; 11.3 mph) submerged
- Range: 8,420 nmi (15,590 km; 9,690 mi) at 8 knots (15 km/h; 9.2 mph) surfaced; 85 nmi (157 km; 98 mi) at 5 knots (9.3 km/h; 5.8 mph) submerged
- Test depth: 50 m (164 ft)
- Complement: 4 officers, 31 enlisted
- Armament: 4 × 50 cm (19.7 in) torpedo tubes

Service record
- Part of: IV Flotilla; Unknown start – 18 March 1915
- Commanders: Kptlt. Wilhelm Plange; 1 August 1914 – 15 February 1915; Kptlt. Otto Weddigen; 16 February – 18 March 1915
- Operations: 1 patrol
- Victories: 4 merchant ships sunk (12,934 GRT); 2 merchant ships damaged (4,317 GRT)

SM U-29 (Note: "SM" stands for "Seiner Majestät" (English: His Majesty's) and combined with the U for Unterseeboot would be translated as His Majesty's Submarine.) was a Type U-27 U-boat of the Imperial German Navy. She served during the First World War.

U-29's last commander was Kapitänleutnant Otto Weddigen. U-29 was sunk with all hands on 18 March 1915 in the Pentland Firth after being rammed by HMS Dreadnought, the only submarine known to have been purposely sunk by a battleship.

== Summary of raiding history ==
Date	Name	Nationality	Tonnage (Note: Tonnages are in gross register tons)	Fate
11 March 1915	Adenwen	United Kingdom	3,798	Damaged
11 March 1915	Auguste Conseil	France	2,952	Sunk
12 March 1915	Andalusian	United Kingdom	2,349	Sunk
12 March 1915	Headlands	United Kingdom	2,988	Sunk
12 March 1915	Indian City	United Kingdom	4,645	Sunk
14 March 1915	Atalanta	United Kingdom	519	Damaged

== Bibliography ==
- Gröner, Erich; Jung, Dieter; Maass, Martin (1991). U-boats and Mine Warfare Vessels. German Warships 1815–1945. Vol. 2. Translated by Thomas, Keith; Magowan, Rachel. London: Conway Maritime Press. ISBN 0-85177-593-4.
- von Mantey, Eberhard (1933). Der Krieg zur See – Der Handelskrieg mit U-Booten. Band 2 (Februar bis September 1915). Berlin: E. S. Mittler & Sohn. p. 34-38. (Der Verlust von „U 29”, Kaptlt. Weddigen, am 18. 3. 15.)
