= Walther Forstmann =

- Born: 9 March 1883; Essen-Werden
- Died: 2 November 1973 (aged 90)
- Military career
- Allegiance: German Empire; Nazi Germany
- Branch: Imperial German Navy; Kriegsmarine
- Service years: 1900–19, 1939-45
- Rank: Kapitän zur See
- Commands: U-12; U-39
- Conflicts: World War I: U-boat Campaign; World War II
- Awards: House Order of Hohenzollern; Order of the Red Eagle; Pour le Mérite

Walther Forstmann (9 March 1883 – 2 November 1973) was one of the most highly decorated U-boat commanders in the Kaiserliche Marine during World War I. He also served in the Kriegsmarine during World War II in different staff positions.

In his time as commander of U-12 and U-39 in World War I, he conducted 47 patrols and succeeded in sinking 148 ships for a total tonnage of 390,797 gross register tons (GRT). As such, he is the second most successful submarine commander ever (by tonnage sunk), after de la Perière.

== World War I ==
On 12 August 1916 Kapitänleutnant Forstmann of U-39 was awarded the Pour le Mérite for his achievements so far in the First World War.

In 1917 Forstmann, in command of U-39, sank five valuable steamers within only two days in the Straits of Gibraltar with over 20,000 GRT, the SS Normanton (3,862 tonnes), SS Mersario (3,847 tonnes), SS Almora (4,385 tonnes), SS Nuceria (4,702 tonnes) and the Japanese steamer SS Sitosan Maru (3,555 tonnes). The ships carried a total load of 31,500 tonnes of coal, of which more than 26,000 tonnes were meant for Italy for use in the winter.

== Interbellum ==
Forstmann wrote his memoirs after the war in the book Hunting in the Mediterranean (German: Auf Jagd im Mittelmeer). In 1921 he qualified as an attorney and in 1924 he became social departmental head and director with the August Thyssen coal company in Duisburg.

From 1929 to 1933 he was a city delegate and parliamentary group leader of the German People's Party in Duisburg.

Between 1933 and 1950 he was a member of the board (1951-1953 member of the supervisory board) of four large housing cooperatives of the Ruhr steel plants.

== World War II ==
In the Second World War Forstmann served as chief of different commands in Osnabrück and Copenhagen. In Copenhagen, he was the commander of the Wehrwirtschaftsstab Denmark, Germany's chief industrial purchasing entity in occupied Denmark. He was promoted to Kapitän zur See on 1 July 1942. He retired from the navy in 1945.

== Postwar career ==
1951 - 1955 He became one of the advisors of the housing company - Rheini dwellings A.G. in Duisburg which was responsible for the movement of several villages to enable development of open cast coal mining. In 1954 he became a member of the supervisory board of this company.

In 1956 he was involved in the design structure of the 30 Pestalozzi villages (de) and became vice-president of the German settler federation, chairman of the executive committee of youth centre place work e. V.

== Awards and decorations ==
- Gold German Sports Badge (1933)
- Iron Cross of 1914, 1st and 2nd class
- Order of Saint Stanislaus, 3rd class
- Hanseatic Cross of Hamburg
- Knights Cross with Swords of the House Order of Hohenzollern
- Order of the Red Eagle 4th Class
- The Honour Cross of the World War 1914/1918
- Pour le Mérite
- U-boat War Badge WW1
- Order of Merit of the Federal Republic of Germany:
  - 1st class, 1952
  - Grand Cross, 3 August 1960 (for his part in the 25-year-old existence of the German settler federation)
  - Grand Cross with Star, 9 March 1968

In 1968 he received an honorary Doctorate from the Roman Accademia Tiberina and in 1972 another from the university of the Mediterranean in Rome.
