= Type U 23 submarine =

German pre-World War I submarine class

Class overview
- Builders: Germaniawerft, Kiel
- Operators: Imperial German Navy
- Preceded by: Type U 19
- Succeeded by: Type U 27
- Completed: 4
- Lost: 2

General characteristics
- Displacement: 669 t (658 long tons) surfaced; 864 t (850 long tons) submerged
- Length: 64.70 m (212.3 ft)
- Beam: 6.32 m (20 ft 9 in)
- Draught: 3.45 m (11 ft 4 in)
- Propulsion: 2 shafts; 2 × Germania 6-cylinder two stroke diesel motors with 1,800 PS (1,320 kW; 1,780 shp); 2 × SSW double Motordynamos with 1,200 PS (880 kW; 1,180 shp); 450rpm surfaced; 330 rpm submerged
- Speed: 16.7 knots (30.9 km/h; 19.2 mph) surfaced; 10.3 knots (19.1 km/h; 11.9 mph) submerged
- Range: 9,910 nmi (18,350 km; 11,400 mi) at 8 knots (15 km/h; 9.2 mph) surfaced; 85 nmi (157 km; 98 mi) at 5 knots (9.3 km/h; 5.8 mph) submerged
- Test depth: about 50 m (160 ft)
- Complement: 4 officers, 31 men
- Armament: 4 × 50 cm (19.7 in) torpedo tubes (2 each bow and stern); 6 torpedoes; 1 × 8.8 cm (3.5 in) SK L/30 gun

Type U 23 was a class of U-boats built during World War I by the Kaiserliche Marine. Four Boats were ordered from Germaniawerft on 18 March 1911.

== Design ==
Type U 23s had an overall length of 64.70 m (212 ft 3 in) The boats' beam was 6.32 m (20 ft 9 in), the draught was 3.45 m (11 ft 4 in). The boats displaced 669 tonnes (658 long tons) when surfaced and 864 t (850 long tons) when submerged.

Type U 23s were fitted with two Germaniawerft 6-cylinder two-stroke diesel engines with a total of 1,800 metric horsepower (1,324 kW; 1,775 bhp) for use on the surface and two SSW double-acting electric motors with a total of 880 kW (1,196 PS; 1,180 shp) for underwater use. These engines powered two shafts, which gave the boats a top surface speed of 16.7 knots (30.9 km/h; 19.2 mph), and 10.3 knots (19.1 km/h; 11.9 mph) when submerged. Cruising range was 9,910 nautical miles (18,350 km; 11,400 mi) at 8 knots (15 km/h; 9.2 mph) on the surface and 85 nautical miles (157 km; 98 mi) at 5 knots (9.3 km/h; 5.8 mph) submerged. Constructional diving depth (Note: Constructional diving depth had a safety factor of 2.5, which meant that crushing depth was 2.5 times construction diving depth.) was 50 m (164 ft 1 in).

The U-boats were armed with four 50 cm (20 in) torpedo tubes, two fitted in the bow and two in the stern, and carried six torpedoes. All boats received one 8.8 cm (3.5 in) SK L/30 deck gun. The boats' complement was 4 officers and 31 enlisted.

== Ships ==
| Name | launched | commissioned | merchant ships sunk (nbr / GRT ) | warships sunk ( nbr / tons ) | Fate |
|---|---|---|---|---|---|
| U-23 | 12 April 1913 | 11 September 1913 | 7 / 8.822 | none | Sunk on 20 July 1915 in the North Sea |
| U-24 | 24 May 1913 | 6 December 1913 | 33 / 105.732 | 1 / 15.250 | Surrendered on 22 November 1918, and scrapped 1921-22 at Swansea |
| U-25 | 12 July 1913 | 9 May 1914 | 21 / 14.126 | none | Surrendered on 23 February 1919, and scrapped 1921-22 at Cherbourg |
| U-26 | 19 October 1913 | 20 May 1914 | 2 / 2.849 | 3 / 10.936 | Sunk in September 1915 in the Baltic Sea |

== Bibliography ==
- Gröner, Erich; Jung, Dieter; Maass, Martin (1991). German Warships 1815–1945, U-boats and Mine Warfare Vessels. Vol. 2. Translated by Thomas, Keith; Magowan, Rachel. London: Conway Maritime Press. ISBN 0-85177-593-4.
- Herzog, Bodo (1993). Deutsche U-Boote : 1906 - 1966 [German U-boats : 1906 - 1966] (in German). Erlangen: Müller. ISBN 9783860700365.
- Möller, Eberhard; Brack, Werner (2004). The Encyclopedia of U-Boats. London: Chatham. ISBN 1-85367-623-3.
- Rössler, Eberhard (1981). The U-boat: The evolution and technical history of German submarines. London: Cassell & Co. ISBN 0-304-36120-8.
