= Type U 27 submarine =

German pre-World War I submarine class

Class overview
- Builders: Kaiserliche Werft Danzig
- Operators: Imperial German Navy
- Preceded by: Type U 23
- Succeeded by: Type U 31
- Completed: 4
- Lost: 3

General characteristics
- Displacement: 675 t (664 long tons) surfaced; 876 t (862 long tons) submerged
- Length: 64.70 m (212 ft 3 in) (o/a)
- Beam: 6.32 m (20 ft 9 in)
- Draught: 3.48 m (11 ft 5 in)
- Speed: 16.7 knots (30.9 km/h; 19.2 mph) surfaced; 9.8 knots (18.1 km/h; 11.3 mph) submerged
- Range: 8,420 nmi (15,590 km; 9,690 mi) at 8 knots (15 km/h; 9.2 mph) surfaced; 85 nmi (157 km; 98 mi) at 5 knots (9.3 km/h; 5.8 mph) submerged
- Test depth: 50 m (164 ft)
- Complement: 4 officers, 31 enlisted
- Armament: 4 × 50 cm (19.7 in) torpedo tubes; 1 × 8.8 cm (3.5 in) SK L/30 deck gun

Type U 27 was a class of U-boats built before World War I by the Kaiserliche Marine. The four Type U 27 U-boats were ordered on 12 February 1912. They were very similar to the preceding Type U 19 and Type U 23.

== Design ==
Type U 27s had an overall length of 64.70 m (212 ft 3 in) The boats' beam was 6.32 m (20 ft 9 in), the draught was 3.56 m (11 ft 8 in), with a total height of 7.68–8.04 m (25 ft 2 in – 26 ft 5 in). The boats displaced 685 tonnes (674 long tons) when surfaced and 867 t (853 long tons) when submerged.

Type U 27s were fitted with two MAN 6-cylinder four-stroke diesel engines with a total of 2,000 metric horsepower (1,471 kW; 1,973 bhp) for use on the surface and two AEG double-acting electric motors with a total of 880 kW (1,196 PS; 1,180 shp) for underwater use. These engines powered two shafts, which gave the boats a top surface speed of 16.7 knots (30.9 km/h; 19.2 mph), and 9.8 knots (18.1 km/h; 11.3 mph) when submerged. Cruising range was 8,420 nautical miles (15,590 km; 9,690 mi) at 8 knots (15 km/h; 9.2 mph) on the surface and 85 nautical miles (157 km; 98 mi) at 5 knots (9.3 km/h; 5.8 mph) submerged. Constructional diving depth (Note: Constructional diving depth had a safety factor of 2.5, which meant that crushing depth was 2.5 times construction diving depth.) was 50 m (164 ft 1 in).

The U-boats were armed with four 50 cm (20 in) torpedo tubes, two fitted in the bow and two in the stern, and carried six torpedoes. All boats received initially one or two 8.8 cm (3.5 in) SK L/30 deck guns. U-30 had its sole deck gun replaced in 1916 with a 10.5 cm (4.1 in) SK L/45 gun. The boats' complement was 4 officers and 31 enlisted.

== Ships ==
Name	Launched	Commissioned	Merchant ships sunk (nbr / GRT )	Warships sunk ( nbr / tons )	Fate
U-27	14 July 1913	8 May 1914	9 / 29,402	2 / 6,290	Sunk on 15 August 1915 in the English Channel.
U-28	30 August 1913	26 July 1914	39 / 93,782	none	Sunk on 2 September 1917 in the Arctic Ocean.
U-29	11 October 1913	1 August 1914	4 / 12,934	none	Sunk on 18 March 1915 in the North Sea.
U-30	15 November 1913	26 August 1914	26 / 47,383	none	Sunk on 22 June 1915 in an accident on the Ems river. Raised in 1918, surrendered and scrapped in 1919–1920 at Blyth.

== Bibliography ==
- Gröner, Erich; Jung, Dieter; Maass, Martin (1991). German Warships 1815–1945, U-boats and Mine Warfare Vessels. Vol. 2. Translated by Thomas, Keith; Magowan, Rachel. London: Conway Maritime Press. ISBN 0-85177-593-4.
- Herzog, Bodo (1993). Deutsche U-Boote : 1906 - 1966 [German U-boats : 1906 - 1966] (in German). Erlangen: Müller. ISBN 9783860700365.
- Möller, Eberhard; Brack, Werner (2004). The Encyclopedia of U-Boats. London: Chatham. ISBN 1-85367-623-3.
- Rössler, Eberhard (1981). The U-boat: The evolution and technical history of German submarines. London: Cassell & Co. ISBN 0-304-36120-8.
