= Ráztely =

- Village
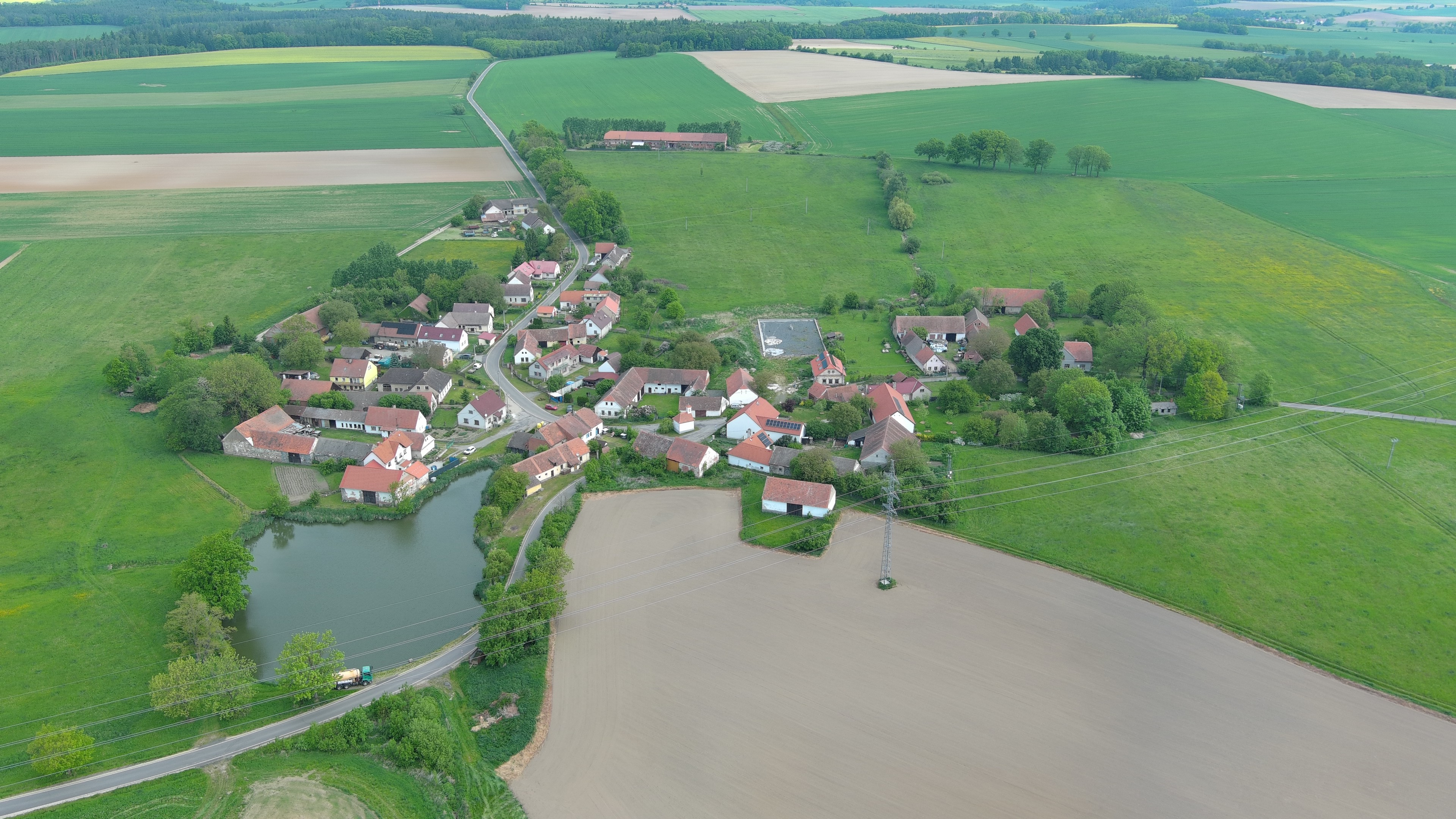
- Aerial photo of Ráztely from the south.

- Location in the Czech Republic.
- Coordinates: 49°30′30″N 13°59′33″E
- Country: Czech Republic
- Region: South Bohemian
- District: Písek
- Municipality: Mirovice

Area
  - Total: 2.11 km^{2} (0.81 sq mi)
- Elevation: 500 m (1,600 ft)

Population (2021)
  - Total: 32
- Time zone: UTC+1 (CET)
  - Summer (DST): UTC+2 (CEST)
- Postal code: 398 04

Ráztely (until 1910 Rastely, until 1950 Raztely; German: Rastel) is a village and administrative part of Mirovice in Písek District in the South Bohemian Region of the Czech Republic. It lies on the border with the Central Bohemian Region, about 3 kilometres (2 mi) west of Mirovice.

== History ==
According to some sources, the first written record of Rastely is from 1068; according to others, it is from 1088. Another record can be found in the Codex Vyssegradensis from about 1085. Until 1323, the village, together with Svučice and another 20 villages along the old salt path from Passau, was the property of the Vyšehrad Chapter.

Rastely later became a fief, and in 1511 its fortified house was held by Jiřík of Rastely (died 1542). His daughter Anna sold the village to Jan and Jiřík of Ploskovice. On 2 May 1584, Jan Vrabský of Drahenice bought, among other property from the royal estate of Příbram, one vassal in Rastely. Six days later, Emperor Rudolf II sold the village of Rastely from the royal property, together with Horosedly, Plíškovice and part of Stražiště, to Kryštof Loubský z Lub na Rencích. After Rastely passed to the Šic family of Drahenice, it was plundered in 1622, and in 1623 it was sold to Příbík Jeníšek of Újezd, whereby it was joined to the estate of Březnice. Part of the village (eight houses) belonged to the former Drahenice estate. Ráztely belongs to the parish of Drahenice.

The local legend O mstě a vojenské cti ("Of Revenge and Military Honour") is associated with a wayside shrine on the road from Ráztely to Březnice. According to tradition, a French soldier who had set fire to a farmstead in Ráztely was hanged there.

== Archaeology ==
An archaeological survey of the cadastral area carried out by Alexandr Debnar in 1999–2002 showed that Ráztely is also a La Tène (Celtic) site. In 1999, in the field called Za rybníkem on the south-western edge of the village, south of the village pond, he found a fragment of a La Tène bracelet made of blue cobalt glass without further coloured decoration. No other La Tène finds, including pottery, were recovered there. The remaining finds from the survey date to the 11th century, which is consistent with the written sources. Numerous pottery fragments scattered across the field, on the southern and south-western edges of the village and on the left bank of the stream flowing south-east of the village towards Mišovice, attest to an extensive early medieval settlement of the Late Hillfort period (phase RS 4 of the Czech archaeological periodization), which according to Debnar was of considerable importance.

== Demographics ==
Historical population
Year	Pop.	±%
1869	152	—
1880	159	+4.6%
1890	157	−1.3%
1900	141	−10.2%
1910	143	+1.4%
1921	140	−2.1%
1930	125	−10.7%
1950	98	−21.6%
1961	91	−7.1%
1970	85	−6.6%
1980	66	−22.4%
1991	43	−34.8%
2001	40	−7.0%
2011	29	−27.5%
2021	32	+10.3%
Source: Censuses

== Administration ==
From 1850 to 1899, Ráztely was a settlement of the municipality of Plíškovice in Blatná District. From 1900 to 1960, it was a separate municipality, first in Blatná District and from 1950 in Písek District. From 1961 to 1971, it was again part of Plíškovice. From 26 November 1971, the date of the elections to the national committees, until 31 December 1987, it was part of the municipality of Myslín, together with which it became part of the town of Mirovice on 1 January 1988. Myslín became a separate municipality again in 1992, but Ráztely has remained part of Mirovice.

== Sights ==
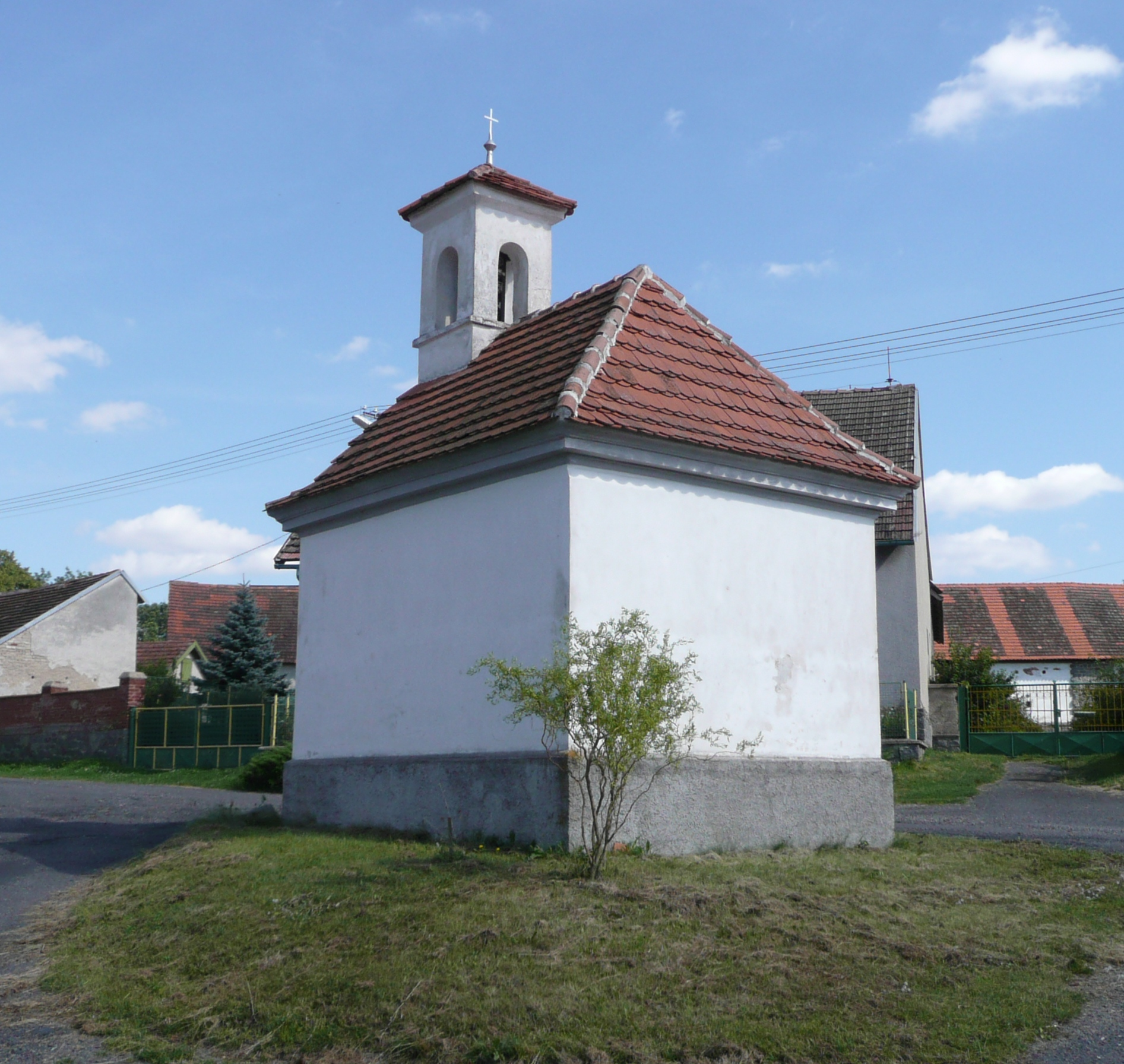
Chapel of Saint John of Nepomuk

- The chapel on the village green was built in 1838 and is dedicated to Saint John of Nepomuk (according to another source, to the Holy Trinity).
- A tall stone cross dated 1872 stands by the road to Sochovice. Another stone cross, whose date is illegible, stands by the road to Březnice.
