= Kobyla =

Kobyla may refer to:

== Places ==
=== Poland ===
- Białebłoto-Kobyla, a village in Masovian Voivodeship
- Kobyla, Podlaskie Voivodeship, a village
- Kobyla, Silesian Voivodeship, a village
- Kobyla Głowa, a village in Lower Silesian Voivodeship
- Gmina Kobyla Góra, an administrative district in Greater Poland Voivodeship
- Kobyla Góra, Greater Poland Voivodeship, a village
- Kobyla Góra, Opole Voivodeship, a village
- Kobyla Łąka, Kuyavian-Pomeranian Voivodeship, a village
- Kobyla Łąka, Masovian Voivodeship, a village
- Kobyla Łąka-Kolonia, a village in Masovian Voivodeship
- Kobyla Kępa, a village in Pomeranian Voivodeship
- Kobyla Miejska, a village in Łódź Voivodeship
- Kobyla Wola, a village in Masovian Voivodeship
- Wólka Kobyla, a village in Masovian Voivodeship

=== Other ===
- Kobylá nad Vidnavkou, a municipality and village in the Czech Republic
- Devínska Kobyla, a mountain in Slovakia
- Kobyla (mountain), a mountain in Ukraine

== People ==
- Andrei Kobyla, 14th century Russian noble

== See also ==
- Kobylin (disambiguation)
- Kobyly (disambiguation)
