= Skalice (river) =

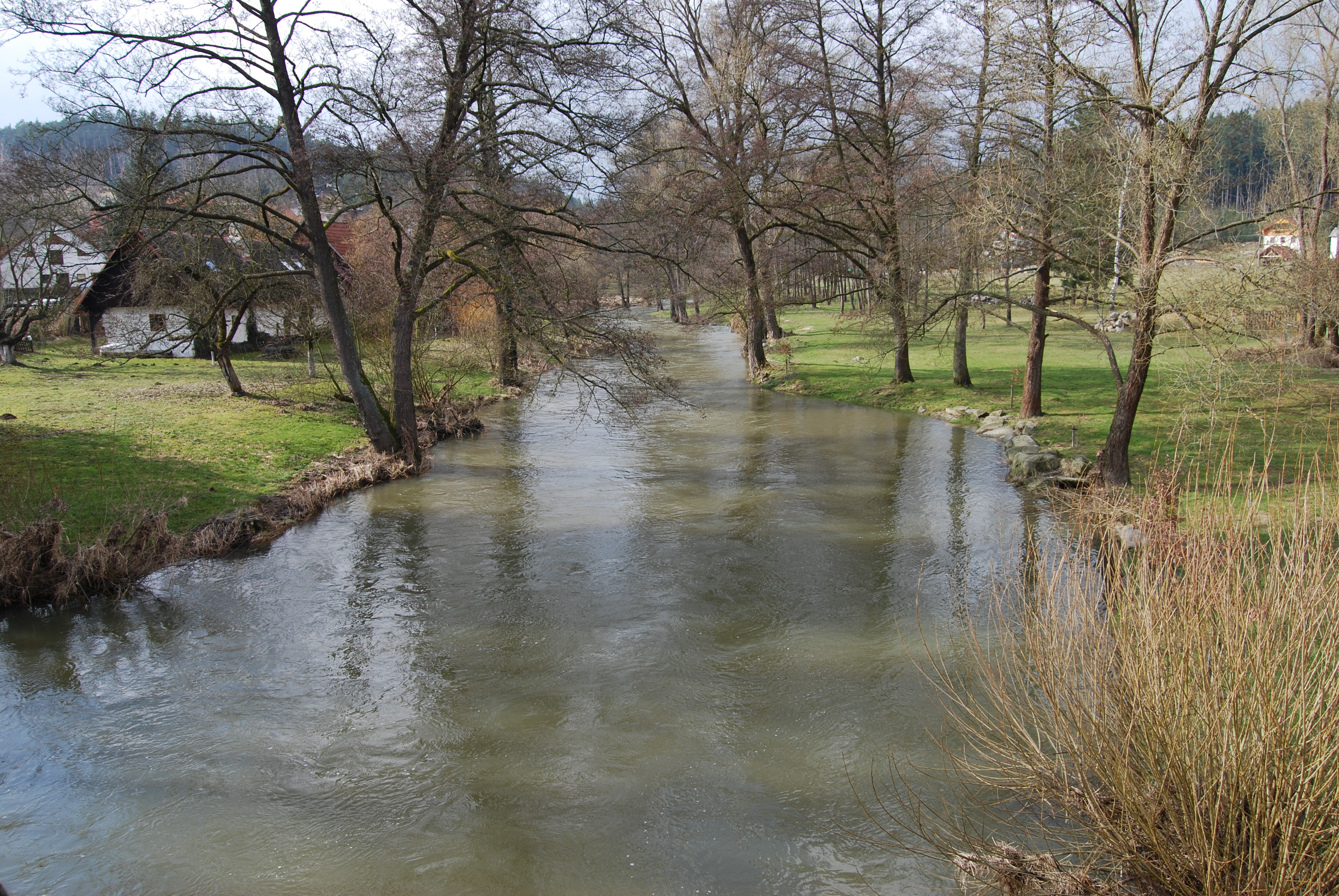
- The Skalice in Varvažov

Location
- Country: Czech Republic
- Regions: Central Bohemian; South Bohemian

Physical characteristics
- Source
  - location: Rožmitál pod Třemšínem, Brdy Highlands
  - coordinates: 49°35′17″N 13°45′46″E
  - elevation: 678 m (2,224 ft)
- Mouth
  - location: Lomnice
  - coordinates: 49°24′57″N 14°8′55″E
  - elevation: 354 m (1,161 ft)
- Length: 52.3 km (32.5 mi)
- Basin size: 374.9 km^{2} (144.7 sq mi)
- Discharge
  - average: 1.45 m^{3}/s (51 cu ft/s) near estuary

Basin features
- Progression: Lomnice→ Otava→ Vltava→ Elbe→ North Sea

The Skalice (Czech pronunciation: [ˈskalɪtsɛ]) is a river in the Czech Republic, a left tributary of the Lomnice River. It flows through the Central Bohemian and South Bohemian regions. It is 52.3 km (32.5 mi) long.

== Etymology ==
The name is derived from the Czech words skála and skalnatý ('rock', 'rocky') and refers to the character of the river bed.

== Characteristic ==
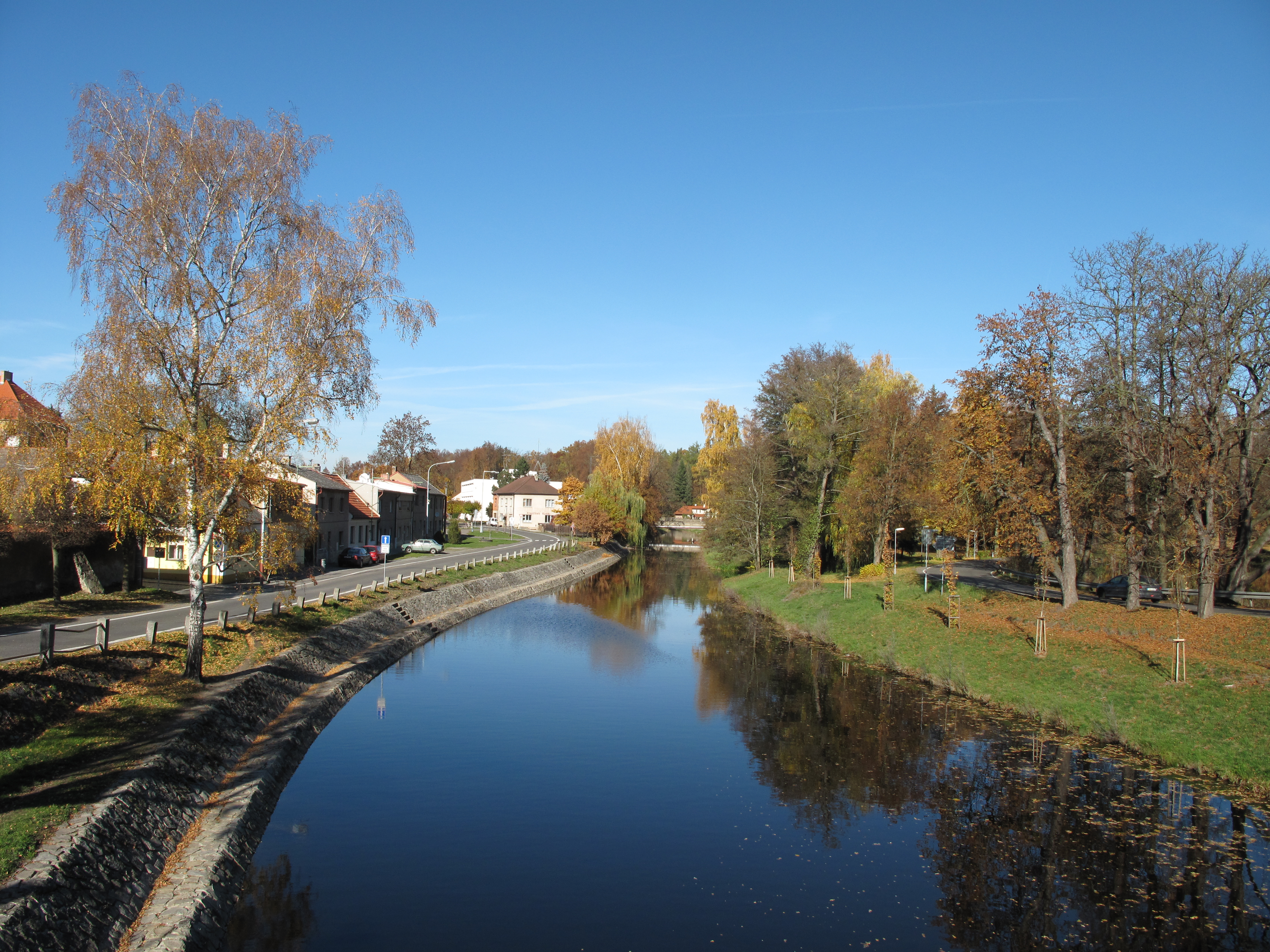
The Skalice in Březnice

The Skalice originates in the territory of Rožmitál pod Třemšínem in the Brdy Highlands at an elevation of 678 m (2,224 ft) and flows to Varvažov, where it enters the Lomnice River at an elevation of 354 m (1,161 ft). It is 52.3 km (32.5 mi) long. Its drainage basin has an area of 374.9 km^{2} (144.7 sq mi).

The longest tributaries of the Skalice are:

Tributary	Length (km)	Side
Hrádecký potok	14.8	left
Mlýnský potok	12.0	right
Zalužanský potok	9.9	left

== Course ==
The most populous settlement on the river is the town of Rožmitál pod Třemšínem, in which territory the river originates. The river further flows through the municipal territories of Věšín, Chrást, Březnice, Nestrašovice, Počaply, Myslín, Mirovice, Horosedly, Nerestce, Čimelice, Rakovice, Smetanova Lhota, Ostrovec and Varvažov.

== Bodies of water ==
There are 529 bodies of water in the basin area. The largest of them are the fishponds Hejný with an area of 20.6 ha (51 acres) and Nerestec with an area of 20.1 ha (50 acres). Several fishponds are built directly on the upper course of the Skalice, in the area of Rožmitál pod Třemšínem.

== Protection of nature ==
The spring and the first kilometres of the Skalice are located within the Brdy Protected Landscape Area.

== Bridges ==
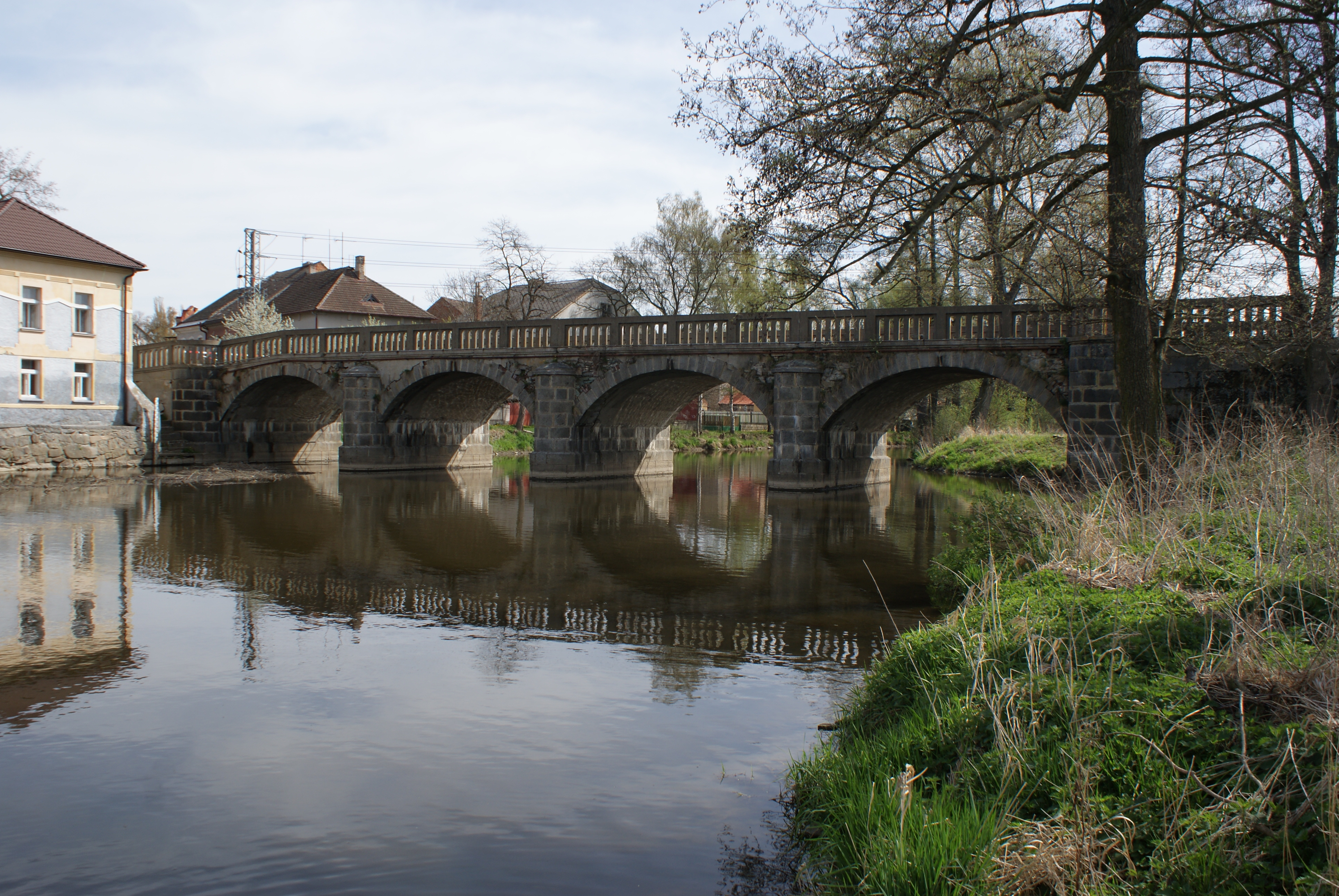
Stone bridge in Mirovice

The river is bridged by three historic stone bridges. There is a four-arch inundation bridge in Mirovice, built in 1870–1876. Its original southern part has not been preserved, but it is still valued for its architectural and structural qualities.

The three-arch bridge in Nerestce was built in 1814–1816 on the site of an older bridge. It used to be decorated with valuable Baroque statues of saints from the mid-18th century. Today, the statues are in the depository of the municipality of Čimelice. In 1963, a new reinforced concrete bridge was built next to the historic bridge and the importance of the old bridge decreased.

The two-arch bridge in Varvažov was built in 1781. It is decorated with a small chapel dedicated to Saint John of Nepomuk.

== See also ==
- List of rivers of the Czech Republic
