= Myslin =

Myslin may refer to:

- Myslín, a municipality and village in the Czech Republic
- Myślin, a village in Masovian Voivodeship, Poland
