= Kozárovice =

- Municipality
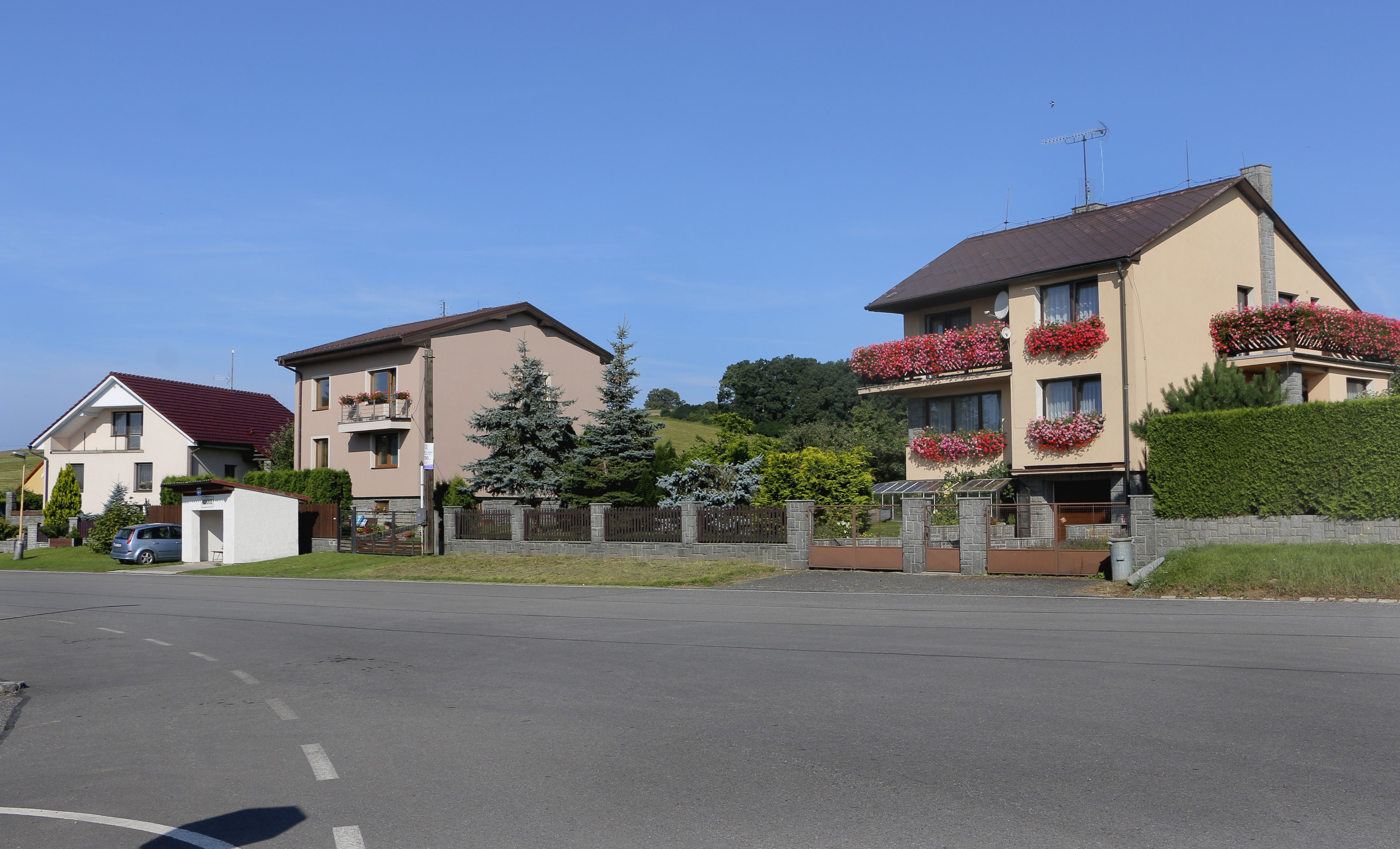
- Centre of Kozárovice

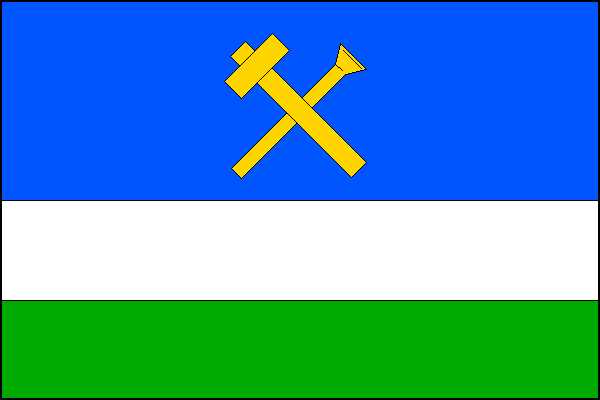
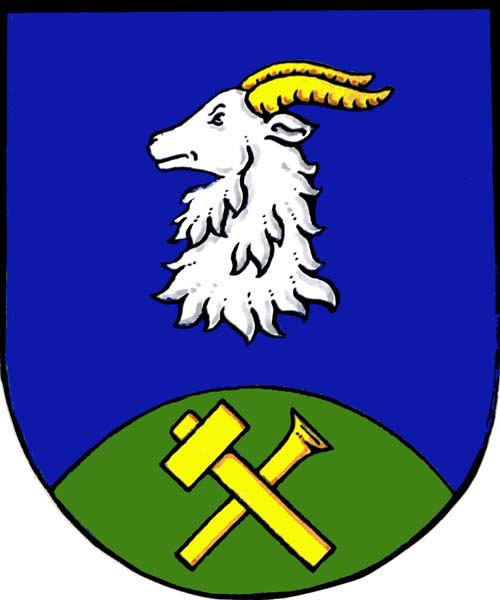
- Flag Coat of arms

- Location in the Czech Republic
- Coordinates: 49°33′20″N 14°6′23″E
- Country: Czech Republic
- Region: Central Bohemian
- District: Příbram
- First mentioned: 1152

Area
  - Total: 14.13 km^{2} (5.46 sq mi)
- Elevation: 493 m (1,617 ft)

Population (2026-01-01)
  - Total: 411
  - Density: 29.1/km^{2} (75.3/sq mi)
- Time zone: UTC+1 (CET)
  - Summer (DST): UTC+2 (CEST)
- Postal codes: 262 72, 262 84
- Website: www.kozarovice.cz

Kozárovice is a municipality and village in Příbram District in the Central Bohemian Region of the Czech Republic. It has about 400 inhabitants.

== Administrative division ==
Kozárovice consists of three municipal parts (in brackets population according to the 2021 census):

- Kozárovice (354)
- Holušice (21)
- Vystrkov (5)

== Etymology ==
The initial name of the village was Kozářovice. The name was derived from the surname Kozář, meaning "the village of Kozář's people". From the 16th century, the name Kozárovice has been used.

== Geography ==
Kozárovice is located about 16 kilometres (10 mi) southeast of Příbram and 58 km (36 mi) south of Prague. It lies in the Benešov Uplands. The highest point is the hill Březina at 568 m (1,864 ft) above sea level. The eastern municipal border is formed by the Vltava River, respectively by the Orlík Reservoir, built on the Vltava.

== History ==
The first written mention of Kozárovice is from 1152. The village was divided into two parts. One part belonged to the Varvažov estate for almost the entire feudal history and shared its owners. The other part was owned by the Prague archbishopric until the Hussite Wars (1419–1434). After the war, it became a property of the royal chamber and was fiefed to various lesser noblemen.

== Demographics ==
Historical population

Year	Pop.	±%
1869	948	—
1880	1,053	+11.1%
1890	1,010	−4.1%
1900	1,023	+1.3%
1910	984	−3.8%

Year	Pop.	±%
1921	897	−8.8%
1930	922	+2.8%
1950	638	−30.8%
1961	599	−6.1%
1970	562	−6.2%

Year	Pop.	±%
1980	503	−10.5%
1991	404	−19.7%
2001	325	−19.6%
2011	385	+18.5%
2021	380	−1.3%

Source: Censuses

== Transport ==
The D4 motorway from Prague to Písek runs through the western part of the municipality.

== Sights ==
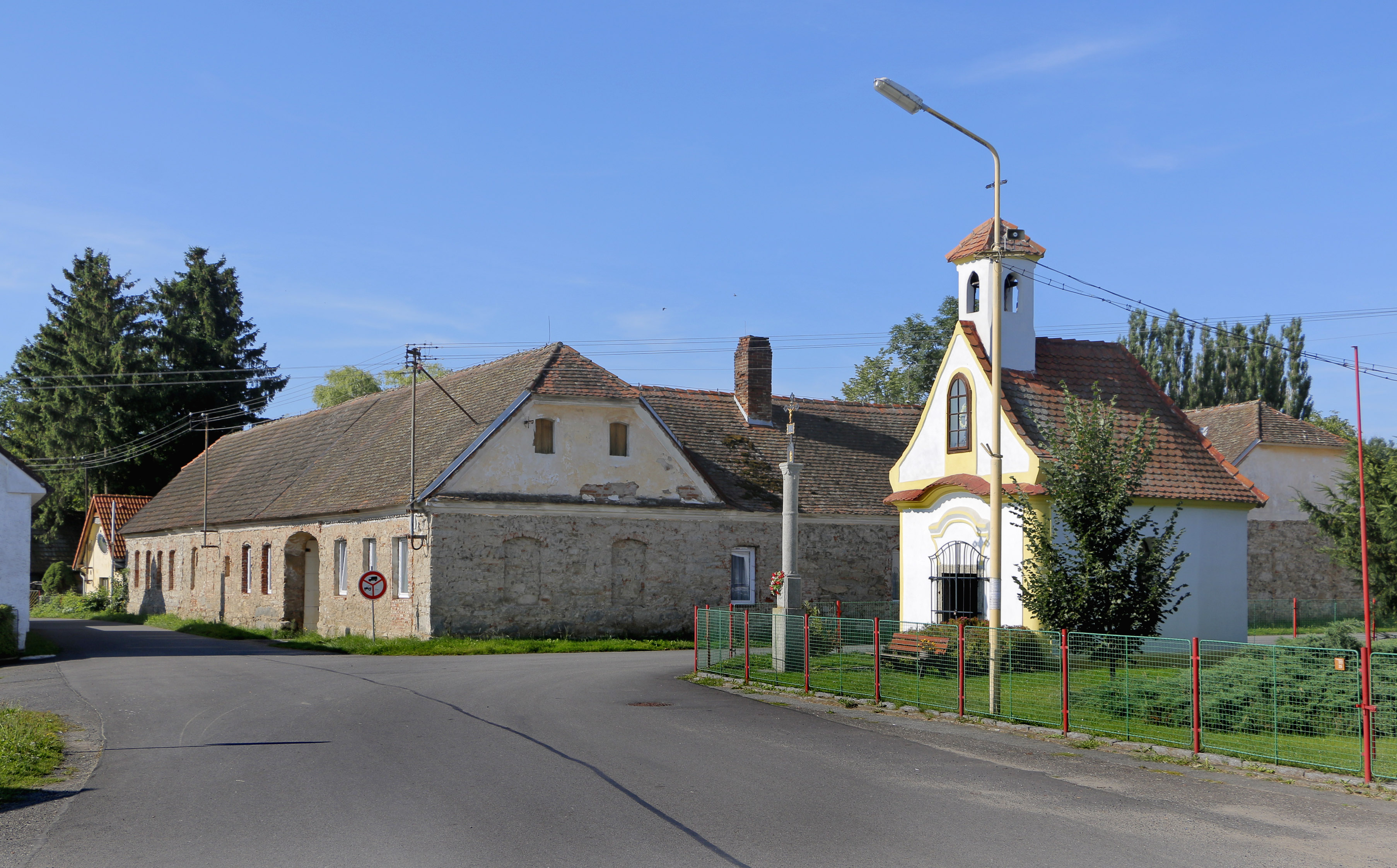
Chapel of the Virgin Mary

The main landmark of Kozárovice is the Chapel of the Virgin Mary. It is a simple late Baroque building from the 1780s. There is a valuable Neoclassical column shrine in front of the chapel, created in 1848.
