= Dźwierzno =

Dźwierzno may refer to the following places:

- Dźwierzno, Kuyavian-Pomeranian Voivodeship (north-central Poland)
- Dźwierzno, Płock County in Masovian Voivodeship (east-central Poland)
- Dźwierzno, Żuromin County in Masovian Voivodeship (east-central Poland)
- Dźwierzno, Człuchów County in Pomeranian Voivodeship (north Poland)
