= Strzeszewo =

Strzeszewo may refer to the following places:

- Strzeszewo, Ciechanów County in Masovian Voivodeship (east-central Poland)
- Strzeszewo, Płock County in Masovian Voivodeship (east-central Poland)
- Strzeszewo, Podlaskie Voivodeship (north-east Poland)
- Strzeszewo, Żuromin County in Masovian Voivodeship (east-central Poland)
- Strzeszewo, Pomeranian Voivodeship (north Poland)
