= Nerestce =

- Municipality
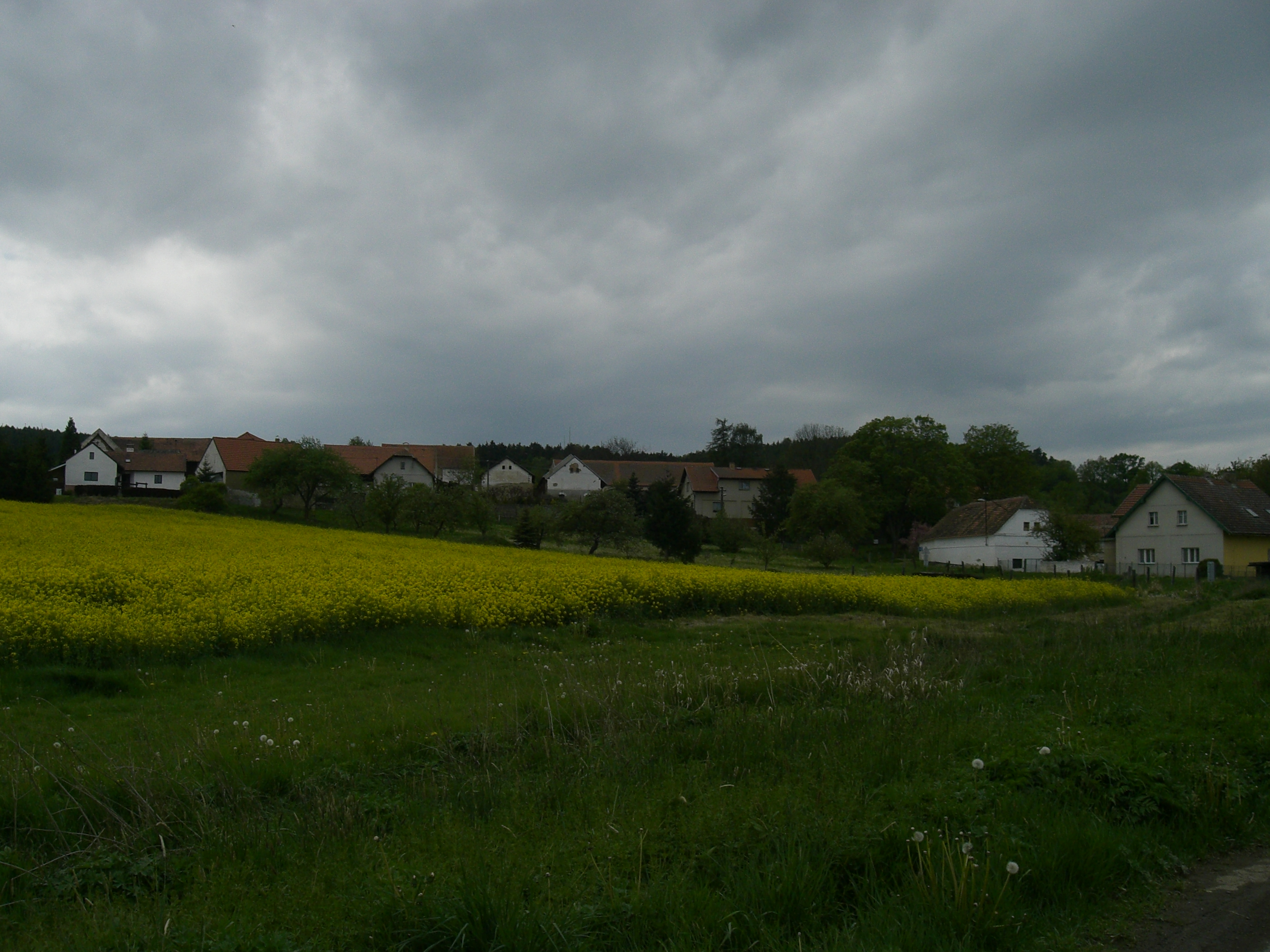
- The village of Horní Nerestce

- Flag Coat of arms

- Location in the Czech Republic
- Coordinates: 49°30′2″N 14°3′46″E
- Country: Czech Republic
- Region: South Bohemian
- District: Písek
- First mentioned: 1227

Area
  - Total: 4.68 km^{2} (1.81 sq mi)
- Elevation: 435 m (1,427 ft)

Population (2026-01-01)
  - Total: 103
  - Density: 22.0/km^{2} (57.0/sq mi)
- Time zone: UTC+1 (CET)
  - Summer (DST): UTC+2 (CEST)
- Postal code: 398 04
- Website: www.nerestce.cz

Nerestce is a municipality in Písek District in the South Bohemian Region of the Czech Republic. It has about 100 inhabitants.

== Administrative division ==
Nerestce consists of two municipal parts (in brackets population according to the 2021 census):

- Dolní Nerestce (77)
- Horní Nerestce (25)

== Etymology ==
The initial name of the village was Neřestce. The name was derived from the Czech word neřestníci, which can be translated as 'vice people', 'immoral people'.

== Geography ==
Nerestce is located about 22 kilometres (14 mi) north of Písek and 64 km (40 mi) south of Prague. It lies in the Benešov Uplands. The highest point is at 515 metres (1,690 ft) above sea level. The Skalice River flows through the municipality.

== History ==
The first written mention of Nerestce is from 1227, when it was owned by the St. George's Convent in Prague. At this time, Dolní Nerestce and Horní Nerestce were not yet distinguished. From 1474, the village belonged to the Čimelice estate and was owned by various less important noble families.

== Demographics ==
Historical population

Year	Pop.	±%
1869	318	—
1880	315	−0.9%
1890	312	−1.0%
1900	281	−9.9%
1910	284	+1.1%

Year	Pop.	±%
1921	328	+15.5%
1930	321	−2.1%
1950	227	−29.3%
1961	208	−8.4%
1970	189	−9.1%

Year	Pop.	±%
1980	159	−15.9%
1991	104	−34.6%
2001	92	−11.5%
2011	100	+8.7%
2021	102	+2.0%

Source: Censuses

== Transport ==
The D4 motorway from Prague to Písek runs through the municipality.

== Sights ==
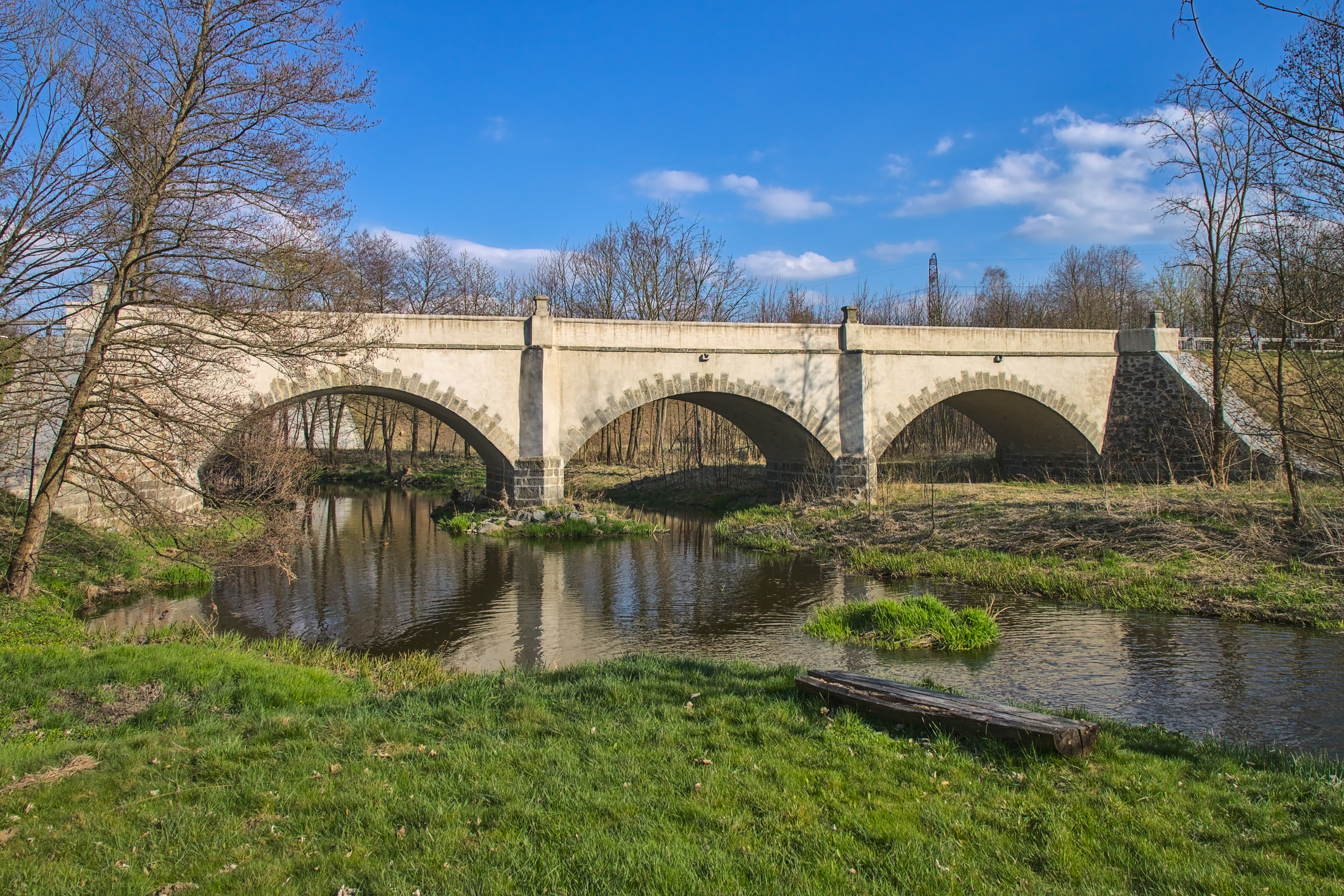
Stone bridge over the Skalice River

The main landmark of Nerestce is the former Dolní Nerestce Castle. Originally a Renaissance fortress froun around 1600, it was rebuilt into a Baroque castle at the end of the 17th century and in the first half of the 18th century. In the 20th century, it was converted into apartments. Sgraffito decoration and vaults have been preserved in the east wing of the castle.

A cultural and technical monument is the local three-arch stone bridge. It was built in 1814–1816 on the site of an older bridge and used to be decorated with valuable Baroque statues of saints from the mid-18th century. Today, the statues are in the depository of the municipality of Čimelice. In 1963, a new reinforced concrete bridge was built next to the historic bridge and the importance of the old bridge decreased.
