= Ludwinowo =

Ludwinowo may refer to the following places:

- Ludwinowo, Kuyavian-Pomeranian Voivodeship (north-central Poland)
- Ludwinowo, Hajnówka County in Podlaskie Voivodeship (north-east Poland)
- Ludwinowo, Suwałki County in Podlaskie Voivodeship (north-east Poland)
- Ludwinowo, Żuromin County in Masovian Voivodeship (east-central Poland)
- Ludwinowo, Ostrołęka County in Masovian Voivodeship (east-central Poland)
- Ludwinowo, Greater Poland Voivodeship (west-central Poland)
