= Albert Popper =

Albert Popper (Czech: Vojtěch Popper; Hebrew name: Abraham; 1808 – 3 September 1889) was a mayor of Vimperk (Winterberg) and doctor for the House of Schwarzenberg.

Popper was born in the village of Bresnitz (Březnice) to a Jewish family. At the time of his birth the number of Jewish families in the Kingdom of Bohemia was strictly controlled by the Familianten quota system, which was partially abolished in 1848 and fully abolished in 1859.

In addition to the government control of Jewish procreation, during most of Popper's life Jews were prohibited from owning property, choosing their place of domicile, attending public schools, or holding public office. This situation did not change until late in Albert Popper's life with the reforms of 1867 in the Austrian portion of the dual monarchy.

Popper, nevertheless, was able to gain permission to attend the University of Vienna, where he earned his doctorate in Pharmacology in 1835. He went on to earn his medical degree and settled in Vimperk where he established a pharmacy and served as the official doctor to the Schwarzenberg princes.

In 1841, Popper published a treatment for Chlorosis (Hypochromic anemia) containing Vitriolum martis (sulfuric acid and iron) and Sal tartari (potassium carbonate) in Österreichische medicinische Wochenschrift which was republished and refined in the following years.

By the time of the Vimperk fire of 1857, Popper was the town's mayor. After the fire, he implored the Habsburg monarchy for assistance. Emperor Franz Joseph himself came to Vimperk and was the guest of Albert Popper. The emperor agreed to provide imperial funds for repair and reconstruction.

== Publications ==
- 1842. Skizzirte Geschichte der fürstl. Schwarzenbergischen Allodial-Herrschaft Winterberg, im Prachiner Kreise Böhmens. (Historical Sketch of the princely Schwarzenberg Allodial Lordship of Vimperk in the Prachatice District of Bohemia)
- 1845. On the Extract of Belladonna in Inflammations of the Throat, by Dr Popper, County Physician at Winterberg. The British Journal of Homœopathy (Translation and reprint of original article from Austrian Weekly Journal).
