= Kobyly =

Kobyly may refer to places:

- Kobyly, Bardejov District, a municipality and village in Slovakia
- Kobyly (Liberec District), a municipality and village in the Czech Republic
- Kobyły, a village in Poland
