= Borki, Żuromin County =

Borki
- Village
- Location within Poland
- Coordinates: 52°56′17″N 20°00′20″E
- Country: Poland
- Voivodeship: Masovian
- County: Żuromin
- Gmina: Bieżuń

Borki [ˈbɔrki] is a village in the administrative district of Gmina Bieżuń, within Żuromin County, Masovian Voivodeship, in east-central Poland.
