= Herold (beer) =

Czech beer brand

Herold Březnice Brewery
- Location: Březnice; Czech Republic
- Opened: 1506
- Website: www.pivovar-herold.cz

Active beers
Name	Type
Bohemian Blond Lager	Lager
Bohemian Granat Lager	Vienna lager
Bohemian Black Lager	Schwarzbier
Bohemian Wheat Lager	Wheat Beer

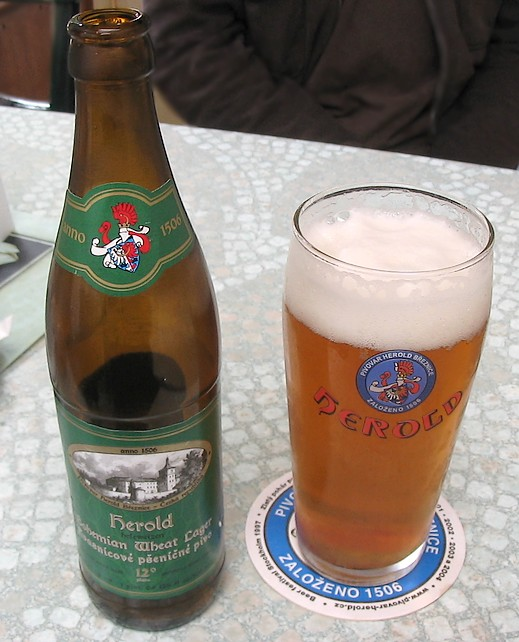
Herold beer

Herold is a brand of beer made in Herold Březnice Brewery, a small brewery in Březnice, a town 60 kilometres south of Prague, Czech Republic.

== History ==
Beer was first noted to have been commercially brewed in 1506. Its age puts it firmly towards the top of the list of world's oldest continuously operating companies.

Following World War II, the brewery was taken over by the government and became part of the state-owned Institute for Brewing and Malt Production. Pivovar Herold Březnice is now once more operating under private ownership for the first time since 1945.

In 2008, the brewery was once again under Czech control when Ballena a.s. bought out the American owners, the new owners also resurrected Herold Weizen.

Herold beer coaster
