= Gołuszyn =

- Village
- Location within Poland
- Coordinates: 52°57′N 19°59′E
- Country: Poland
- Voivodeship: Masovian
- County: Żuromin
- Gmina: Bieżuń

Gołuszyn [ɡɔˈwuʂɨn] is a village in the administrative district of Gmina Bieżuń, within Żuromin County, Masovian Voivodeship, in east-central Poland.
