= Gmina Bieżuń =

Gmina Bieżuń Bieżuń Commune
- Gmina
- Flag Coat of arms
- Interactive map of Gmina Bieżuń
- Coordinates (Bieżuń): 52°57′N 19°53′E
- Country: Poland
- Voivodeship: Masovian
- County: Żuromin
- Seat: Bieżuń

Area
  - Total: 122.02 km^{2} (47.11 sq mi)

Population (2006)
  - Total: 5,234
  - Density: 42.89/km^{2} (111.1/sq mi)
  - Urban: 1,874
  - Rural: 3,360
- Time zone: UTC+1 (CET)
  - Summer (DST): UTC+2 (CEST)
- Vehicle registration: WZU
- Website: https://www.biezun.pl/

Gmina Bieżuń is an urban-rural gmina (administrative district) in Żuromin County, Masovian Voivodeship, in north-central Poland. Its seat is the town of Bieżuń, which lies approximately 13 kilometres (8 mi) south of Żuromin and 112 km (70 mi) north-west of Warsaw.

The gmina covers an area of 122.02 square kilometres (47.1 sq mi), and as of 2006 its total population is 5,234, of which the population of Bieżuń is 1,874, and the population of the rural part of the gmina is 3,360.

== Villages ==
Apart from the town of Bieżuń, Gmina Bieżuń contains the villages and settlements of Adamowo, Bielawy Gołuskie, Borki, Dąbrówki, Dźwierzno, Gołuszyn, Karniszyn, Karniszyn-Parcele, Kobyla Łąka, Kobyla Łąka-Kolonia, Kocewko, Kocewo, Ludwinowo, Mak, Małocin, Marysin, Myślin, Pełki, Pozga, Sadłowo, Sadłowo-Parcele, Sławęcin, Stanisławowo, Stawiszyn-Łaziska, Stawiszyn-Zwalewo, Strzeszewo, Trzaski, Wieluń-Zalesie, Wilewo, Władysławowo and Zgliczyn-Pobodzy.

== Neighbouring gminas ==
Gmina Bieżuń is bordered by the gminas of Lutocin, Radzanów, Rościszewo, Siemiątkowo, Szreńsk, Zawidz and Żuromin.
