= Sławęcin, Masovian Voivodeship =

Sławęcin
- Village
- Location within Poland
- Coordinates: 52°58′N 20°0′E
- Country: Poland
- Voivodeship: Masovian
- County: Żuromin
- Gmina: Bieżuń

Sławęcin [swaˈvɛnt͡ɕin] is a village in the administrative district of Gmina Bieżuń, within Żuromin County, Masovian Voivodeship, in east-central Poland.
