= Mak, Masovian Voivodeship =

Mak
- Village
- Location within Poland
- Coordinates: 52°56′N 19°51′E
- Country: Poland
- Voivodeship: Masovian
- County: Żuromin
- Gmina: Bieżuń

Mak [mak] is a village in the administrative district of Gmina Bieżuń, within Żuromin County, Masovian Voivodeship, in east-central Poland.
