= Stanisławowo, Żuromin County =

Stanisławowo
- Village
- Location within Poland
- Coordinates: 52°55′N 19°55′E
- Country: Poland
- Voivodeship: Masovian
- County: Żuromin
- Gmina: Bieżuń

Stanisławowo [staniswaˈvɔvɔ] is a village in the administrative district of Gmina Bieżuń, within Żuromin County, Masovian Voivodeship, in east-central Poland.
