= Małocin, Masovian Voivodeship =

Małocin
- Village
- Location within Poland
- Coordinates: 53°0′N 20°0′E
- Country: Poland
- Voivodeship: Masovian
- County: Żuromin
- Gmina: Bieżuń

Małocin [maˈwɔt͡ɕin] is a village in the administrative district of Gmina Bieżuń, within Żuromin County, Masovian Voivodeship, in east-central Poland.
