= Stawiszyn-Łaziska =

- Village
- Location within Poland
- Coordinates: 52°58′N 19°58′E
- Country: Poland
- Voivodeship: Masovian
- County: Żuromin
- Gmina: Bieżuń
- Population: 210

Stawiszyn-Łaziska [staˈviʂɨn waˈʑiska] is a village in the administrative district of Gmina Bieżuń, within Żuromin County, Masovian Voivodeship, in east-central Poland.
