= Stawiszyn-Zwalewo =

- Village
- Location within Poland
- Coordinates: 52°59′N 19°59′E
- Country: Poland
- Voivodeship: Masovian
- County: Żuromin
- Gmina: Bieżuń

Stawiszyn-Zwalewo [staˈviʂɨn zvaˈlɛvɔ] is a village in the administrative district of Gmina Bieżuń, within Żuromin County, Masovian Voivodeship, in east-central Poland.
