= Pełki =

- Village
- Location within Poland
- Coordinates: 52°59′N 20°1′E
- Country: Poland
- Voivodeship: Masovian
- County: Żuromin
- Gmina: Bieżuń

Pełki [ˈpɛu̯ki] is a village in the administrative district of Gmina Bieżuń, within Żuromin County, Masovian Voivodeship, in east-central Poland.
