= Trzaski, Żuromin County =

Trzaski
- Village
- Location within Poland
- Coordinates: 53°0′N 20°2′E
- Country: Poland
- Voivodeship: Masovian
- County: Żuromin
- Gmina: Bieżuń

Trzaski [ˈtʂaski] is a village in the administrative district of Gmina Bieżuń, within Żuromin County, Masovian Voivodeship, in east-central Poland.
