= Marysin, Żuromin County =

Marysin
- Village
- Location within Poland
- Coordinates: 52°57′12″N 19°58′09″E
- Country: Poland
- Voivodeship: Masovian
- County: Żuromin
- Gmina: Bieżuń

Marysin [maˈrɨɕin] is a village in the administrative district of Gmina Bieżuń, within Żuromin County, Masovian Voivodeship, in east-central Poland.
