= Karniszyn =

- Village
- Location within Poland
- Coordinates: 52°58′34″N 19°54′11″E
- Country: Poland
- Voivodeship: Masovian
- County: Żuromin
- Gmina: Bieżuń

Population
  - Total: 266
- Time zone: UTC+1 (CET)
  - Summer (DST): UTC+2 (CEST)
- Vehicle registration: WZU

Karniszyn [karˈniʂɨn] is a village in the administrative district of Gmina Bieżuń, within Żuromin County, Masovian Voivodeship, in north-central Poland. It is situated on the Luta River, a tributary of Wkra.

Karniszyn was a private town, administratively located in the Szreńsk County in the Płock Voivodeship in the Greater Poland Province of the Kingdom of Poland.
