= Mirovice =

- Town
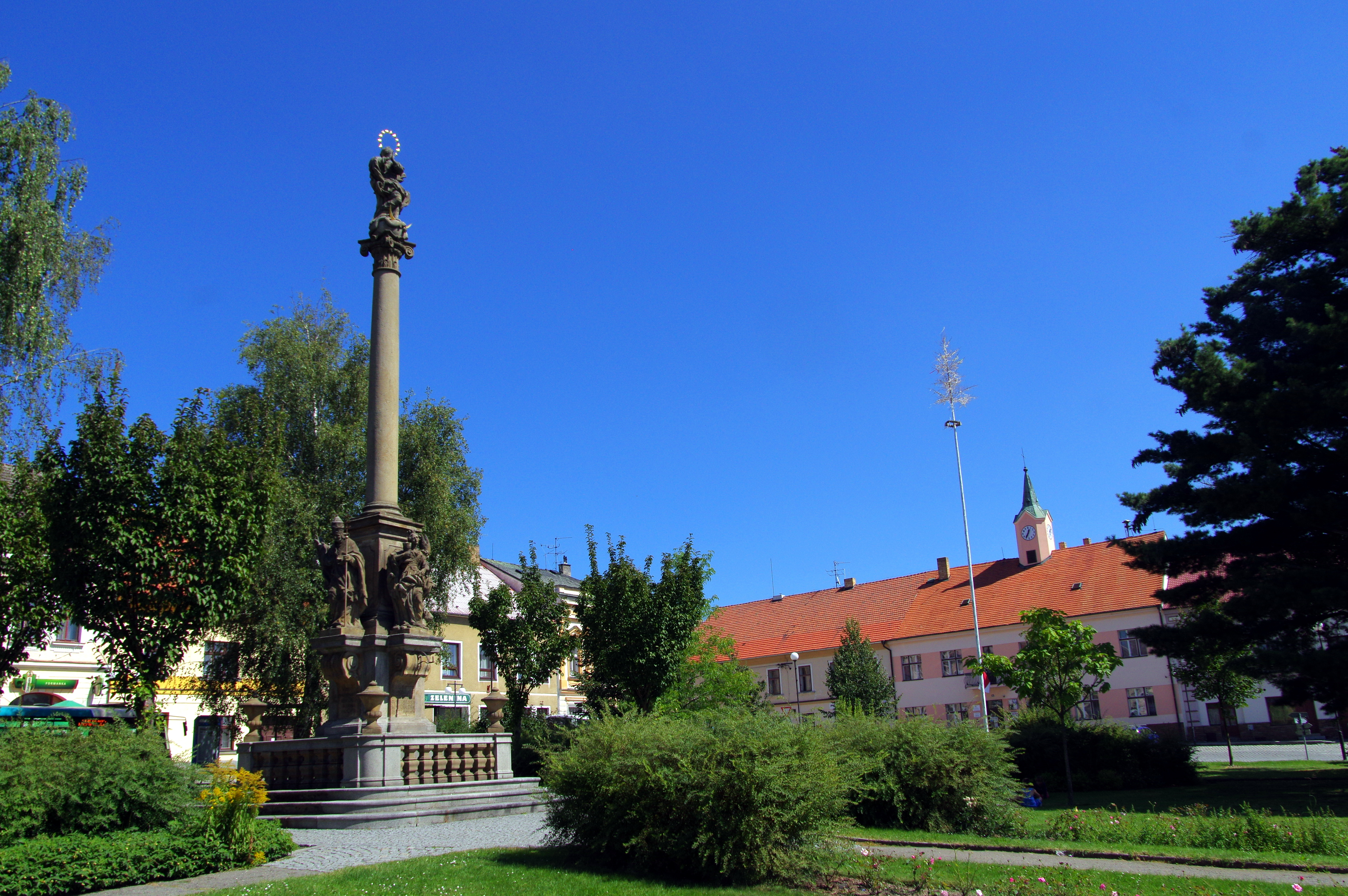
- Town square with the Marian column

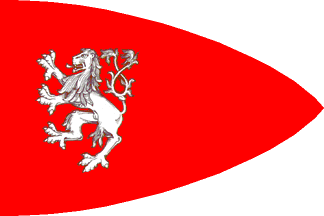
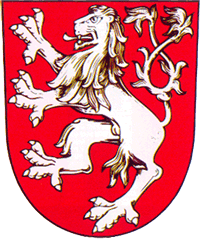
- Flag Coat of arms

- Location in the Czech Republic
- Coordinates: 49°30′56″N 14°2′9″E
- Country: Czech Republic
- Region: South Bohemian
- District: Písek
- First mentioned: 1323

Area
  - Total: 22.04 km^{2} (8.51 sq mi)
- Elevation: 433 m (1,421 ft)

Population (2026-01-01)
  - Total: 1,627
  - Density: 73.82/km^{2} (191.2/sq mi)
- Time zone: UTC+1 (CET)
  - Summer (DST): UTC+2 (CEST)
- Postal code: 398 06
- Website: www.mirovice-mesto.cz

Mirovice (Czech pronunciation: [ˈmɪrovɪtsɛ]) is a town in Písek District in the South Bohemian Region of the Czech Republic. It has about 1,600 inhabitants. The town is located on the Skalice River in the Benešov Uplands.

The historic town centre is well preserved and is protected as an urban monument zone. The main landmark of Mirovice is the Church of Saint Clement.

== Administrative division ==
Mirovice consists of nine municipal parts (in brackets population according to the 2021 census):

- Mirovice (1,306)
- Boješice (47)
- Kakovice (30)
- Ohař (12)
- Plíškovice (74)
- Ráztely (32)
- Řeteč (32)
- Sochovice (10)
- Touškov (27)

== Etymology ==
The name is derived from the personal name Mír, meaning "the village of Mír's people".

== Geography ==
Mirovice is located about 24 kilometres (15 mi) north of Písek and 61 km (38 mi) southwest of Prague. It lies in the Benešov Uplands. The highest point is the flat hill Chlumek at 526 m (1,726 ft) above sea level. The Skalice River flows through the town.

== History ==
The first written mention of Mirovice is from 1323. The oldest part of Mirovice is Ráztely, mentioned already in 1088.

== Demographics ==
Historical population

Year	Pop.	±%
1869	2,196	—
1880	2,256	+2.7%
1890	2,200	−2.5%
1900	1,980	−10.0%
1910	2,013	+1.7%

Year	Pop.	±%
1921	2,020	+0.3%
1930	1,999	−1.0%
1950	1,693	−15.3%
1961	1,747	+3.2%
1970	1,639	−6.2%

Year	Pop.	±%
1980	1,724	+5.2%
1991	1,637	−5.0%
2001	1,711	+4.5%
2011	1,566	−8.5%
2021	1,570	+0.3%

Source: Censuses

== Transport ==
The I/19 road from Plzeň to Tábor runs through the town.

Mirovice is located on the major railway line Prague–České Budějovice.

== Sights ==
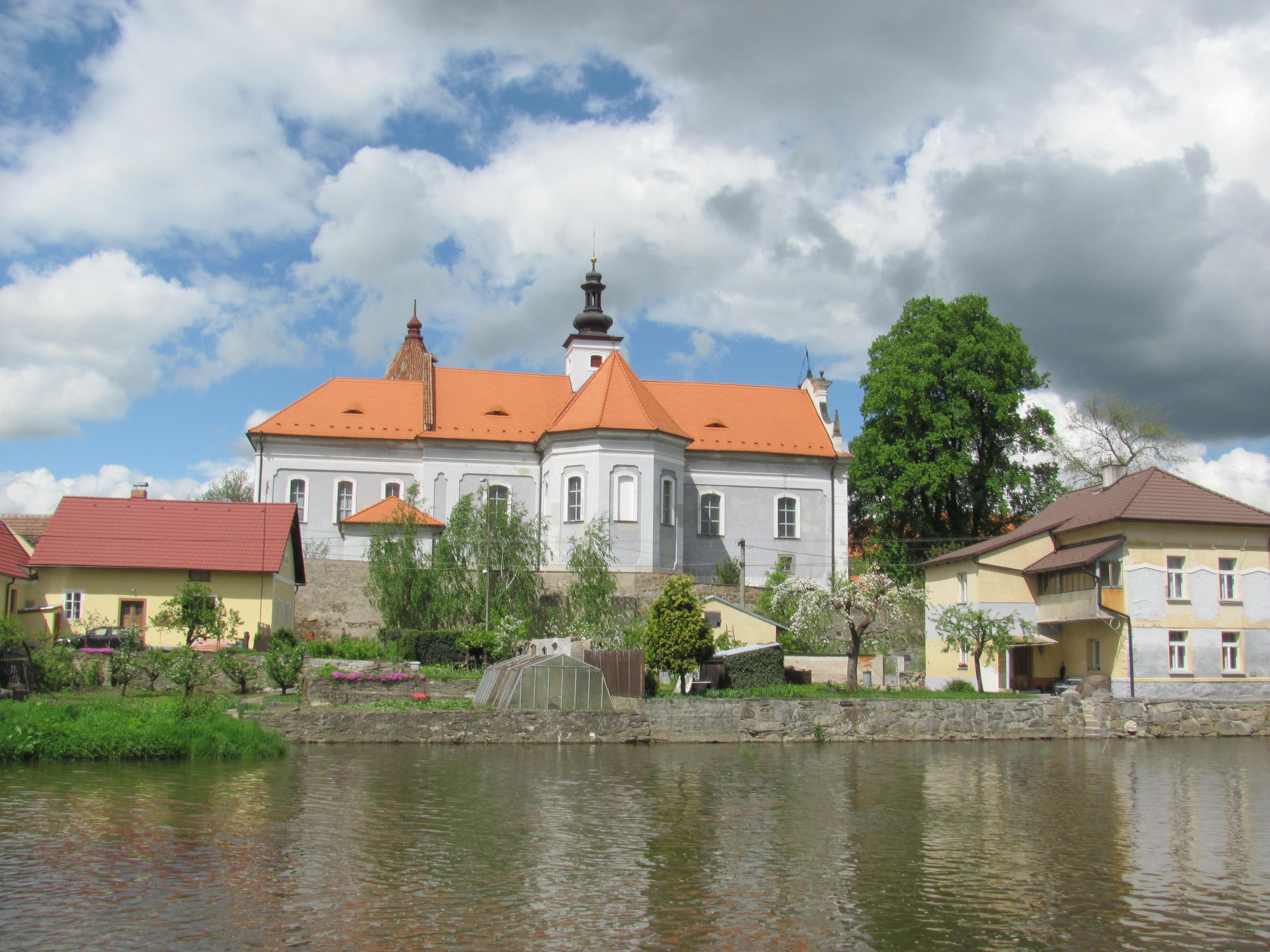
Church of Saint Clement

The main landmark of Mirovice is the Church of Saint Clement. It was built in the early Gothic style in the mid-13th century. In 1724, it was rebuilt in the Baroque style. Next to the church is a separate Renaissance bell tower.

The Marian column on the town square dates from 1717.

== Twin towns – sister cities ==
Mirovice is twinned with:

- Bätterkinden, Switzerland
