= Adamowo, Żuromin County =

Adamowo
- Village
- Location within Poland
- Coordinates: 52°55′N 19°53′E
- Country: Poland
- Voivodeship: Masovian
- County: Żuromin
- Gmina: Bieżuń

Adamowo [adaˈmɔvɔ] is a village in the administrative district of Gmina Bieżuń, within Żuromin County, Masovian Voivodeship, in east-central Poland.
