= Počaply =

- Municipality
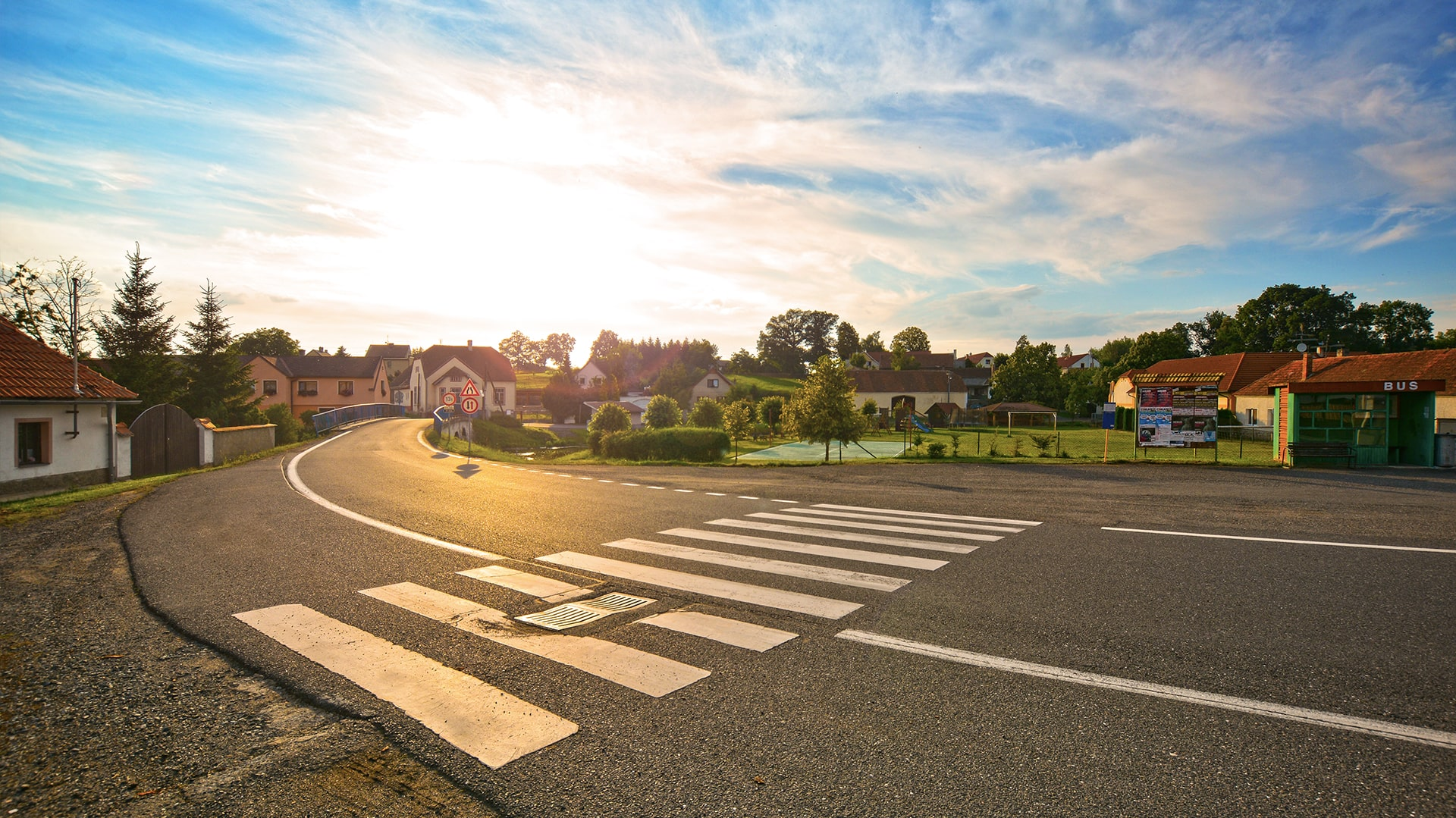
- Centre of Počaply

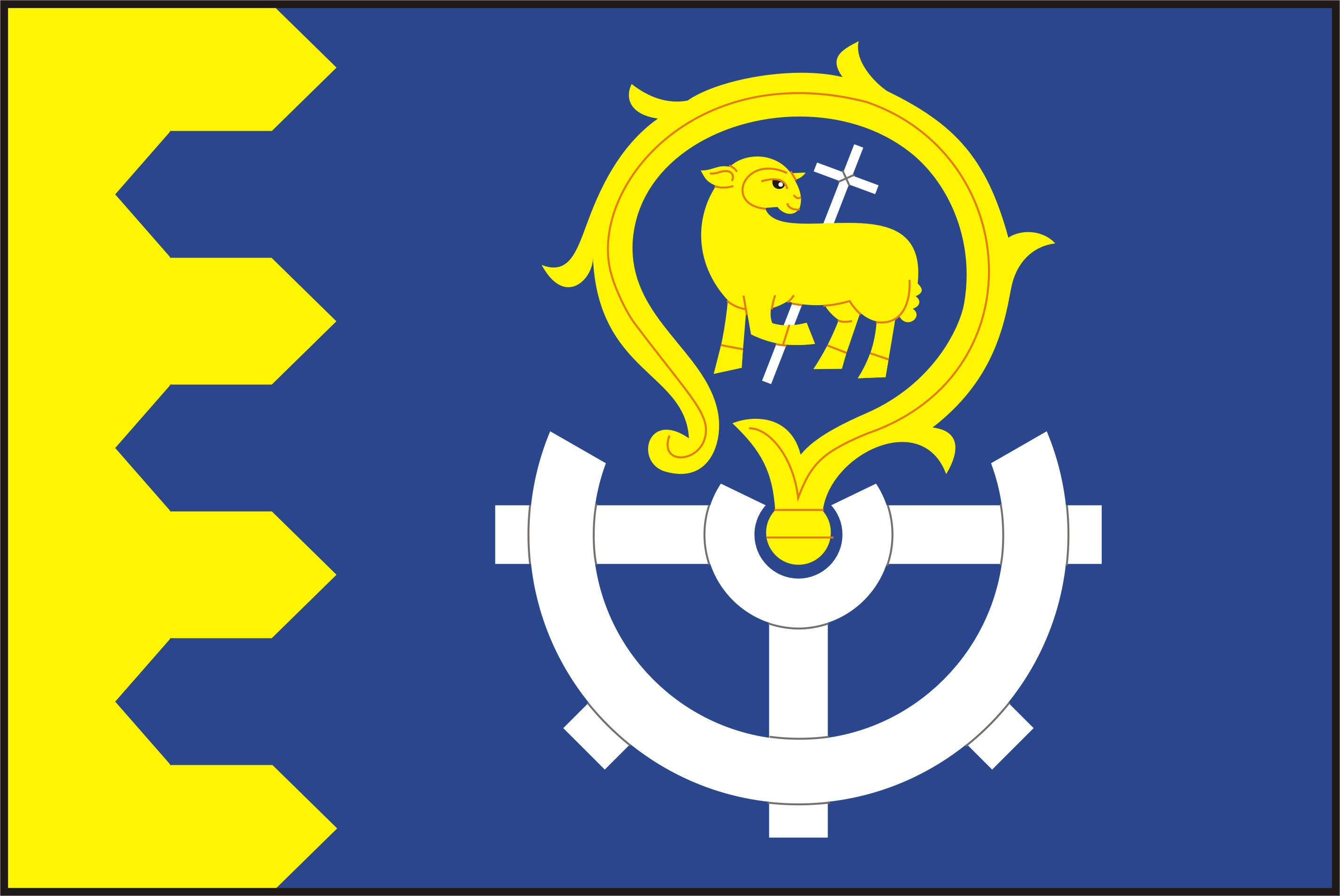
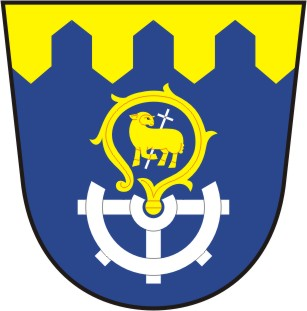
- Flag Coat of arms

- Location in the Czech Republic
- Coordinates: 49°32′20″N 13°59′0″E
- Country: Czech Republic
- Region: Central Bohemian
- District: Příbram
- First mentioned: 1380

Area
  - Total: 8.15 km^{2} (3.15 sq mi)
- Elevation: 461 m (1,512 ft)

Population (2026-01-01)
  - Total: 99
  - Density: 12/km^{2} (31/sq mi)
- Time zone: UTC+1 (CET)
  - Summer (DST): UTC+2 (CEST)
- Postal code: 262 72
- Website: www.pocaply.cz

Počaply is a municipality and village in Příbram District in the Central Bohemian Region of the Czech Republic. It has about 100 inhabitants.

== Administrative division ==
Počaply consists of two municipal parts (in brackets population according to the 2021 census):

- Počaply (96)
- Stražiště (3)

== Demographics ==
Historical population
Year	Pop.	±%
1869	352	—
1880	413	+17.3%
1890	356	−13.8%
1900	366	+2.8%
1910	345	−5.7%
1921	363	+5.2%
1930	274	−24.5%
1950	221	−19.3%
1961	209	−5.4%
1970	166	−20.6%
1980	140	−15.7%
1991	129	−7.9%
2001	92	−28.7%
2011	111	+20.7%
2021	99	−10.8%
Source: Censuses
