= Čimelice =

- Municipality
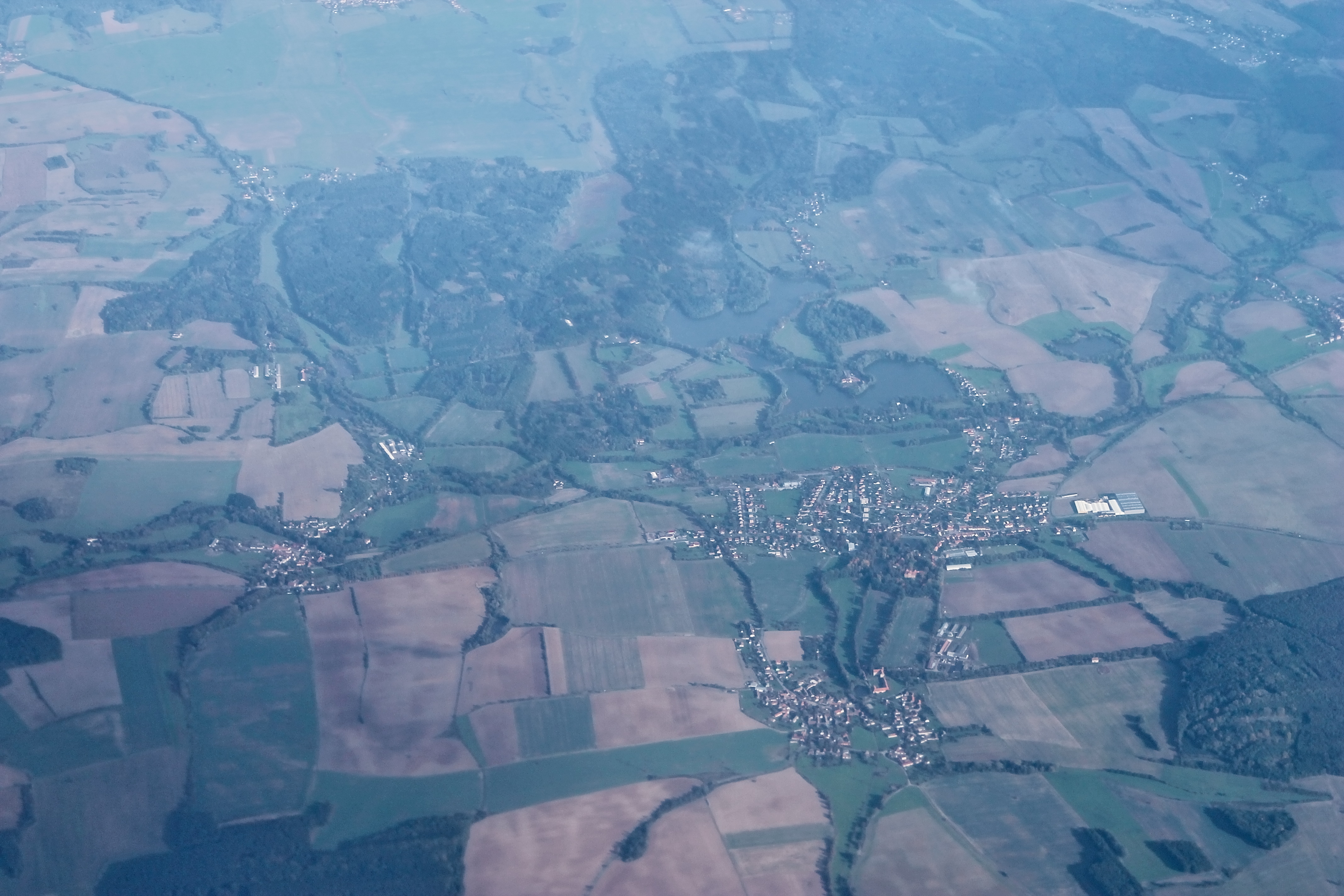
- Aerial view

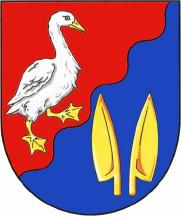
- Flag Coat of arms

- Location in the Czech Republic
- Coordinates: 49°27′56″N 14°4′9″E
- Country: Czech Republic
- Region: South Bohemian
- District: Písek
- First mentioned: 1400

Area
  - Total: 10.29 km^{2} (3.97 sq mi)
- Elevation: 400 m (1,300 ft)

Population (2026-01-01)
  - Total: 1,018
  - Density: 98.93/km^{2} (256.2/sq mi)
- Time zone: UTC+1 (CET)
  - Summer (DST): UTC+2 (CEST)
- Postal code: 398 04
- Website: www.cimelice.cz

Čimelice (German: Tschimelitz) is a municipality and village in Písek District in the South Bohemian Region of the Czech Republic. It has about 1,000 inhabitants.

== Administrative division ==
Čimelice consists of two municipal parts (in brackets population according to the 2021 census):

- Čimelice (855)
- Krsice (89)

== Etymology ==
The name is derived from the personal name Čmel, meaning "the village of Čmel's people". For easier pronunciation, an 'i' was inserted in the name.

== Geography ==
Čimelice is located about 18 kilometres (11 mi) north of Písek and 65 km (40 mi) southwest of Prague. It lies in the Tábor Uplands. The Skalice River flows through the municipality. There are several large fishponds in the municipality: Bisingrovský rybník, Lipšice, Nerestec, Stejskal, Valný rybník and Zástava. Small ponds called Kostelák and Pivovarský rybník are in the centre of Čimelice.

== History ==
The first written mention of Čimelice is from 1400. The village of Krsice was founded in 1233. After 1720, a set of connected fishponds was established here.

== Demographics ==
Historical population

| Year | Pop. | ±% |
|---|---|---|
| 1869 | 1,176 | — |
| 1880 | 1,223 | +4.0% |
| 1890 | 1,190 | −2.7% |
| 1900 | 1,127 | −5.3% |
| 1910 | 1,106 | −1.9% |

| Year | Pop. | ±% |
|---|---|---|
| 1921 | 1,105 | −0.1% |
| 1930 | 1,017 | −8.0% |
| 1950 | 936 | −8.0% |
| 1961 | 1,018 | +8.8% |
| 1970 | 1,017 | −0.1% |

| Year | Pop. | ±% |
|---|---|---|
| 1980 | 1,033 | +1.6% |
| 1991 | 1,074 | +4.0% |
| 2001 | 1,045 | −2.7% |
| 2011 | 974 | −6.8% |
| 2021 | 944 | −3.1% |

Source: Censuses

== Transport ==
The D4 motorway from Prague to Písek runs through the northern part of the municipality.

Čimelice is located on the railway line Prague–České Budějovice.

== Sights ==
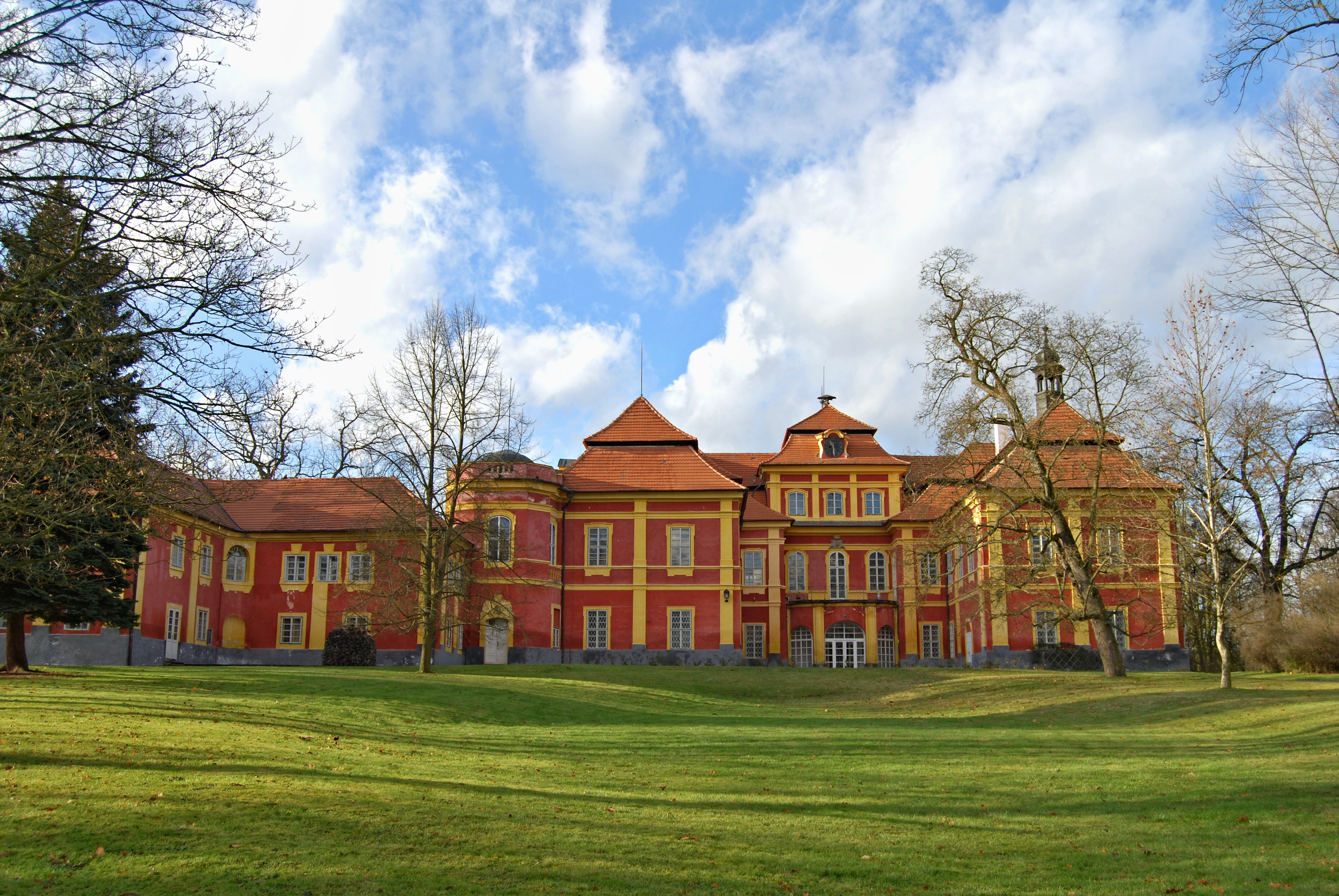
Čimelice Castle

The most notable landmarks are the Church of Holy Trinity and the Čimelice Castle with its English park. The church was built at the turn of the 15th and 16th centuries, and expanded with a tower built in 1800–1820. The castle was built in 1728–1730.
