= Drahenice =

- Municipality
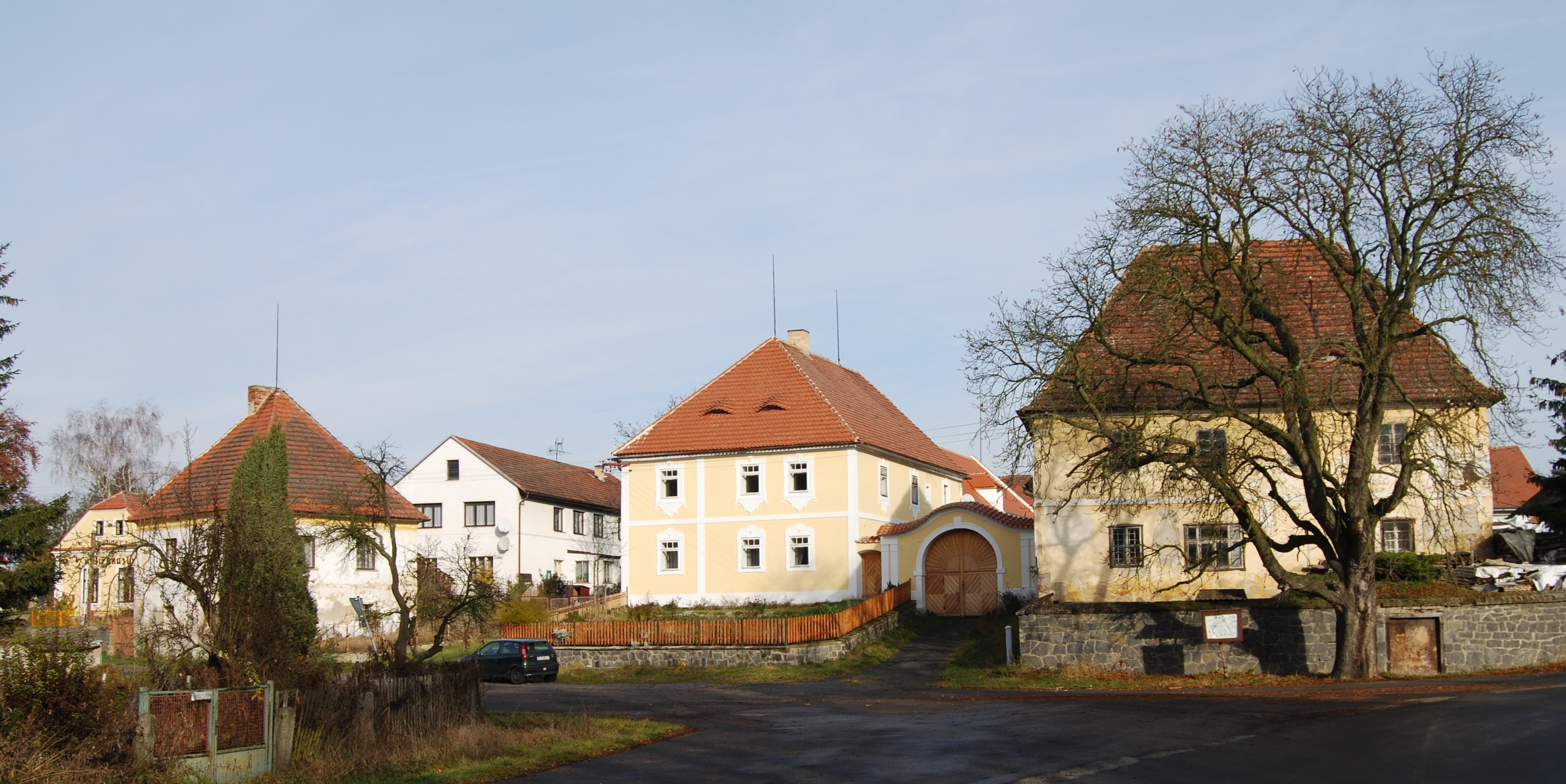
- Centre of Drahenice

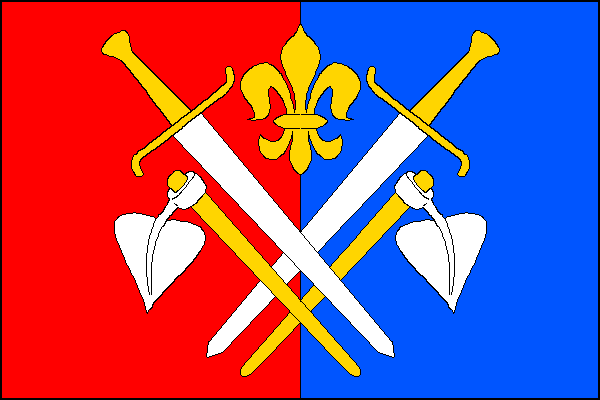
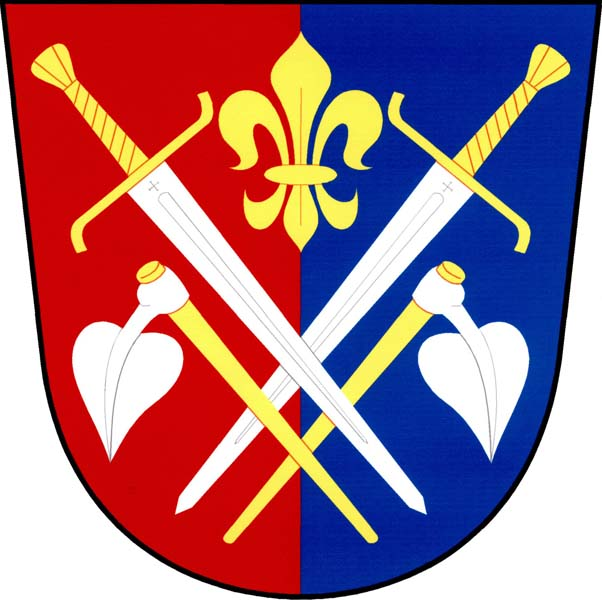
- Flag Coat of arms

- Location in the Czech Republic
- Coordinates: 49°31′15″N 13°57′30″E
- Country: Czech Republic
- Region: Central Bohemian
- District: Příbram
- First mentioned: 1227

Area
  - Total: 5.58 km^{2} (2.15 sq mi)
- Elevation: 495 m (1,624 ft)

Population (2026-01-01)
  - Total: 150
  - Density: 27/km^{2} (70/sq mi)
- Time zone: UTC+1 (CET)
  - Summer (DST): UTC+2 (CEST)
- Postal code: 262 85
- Website: www.obecdrahenice.cz

Drahenice (German: Drahenitz) is a municipality and village in Příbram District in the Central Bohemian Region of the Czech Republic. It has about 200 inhabitants.

== Demographics ==
Historical population
Year	Pop.	±%
1869	578	—
1880	592	+2.4%
1890	532	−10.1%
1900	504	−5.3%
1910	520	+3.2%
1921	485	−6.7%
1930	469	−3.3%
1950	346	−26.2%
1961	333	−3.8%
1970	287	−13.8%
1980	223	−22.3%
1991	185	−17.0%
2001	188	+1.6%
2011	160	−14.9%
2021	152	−5.0%
Source: Censuses
