= Varvažov =

- Municipality
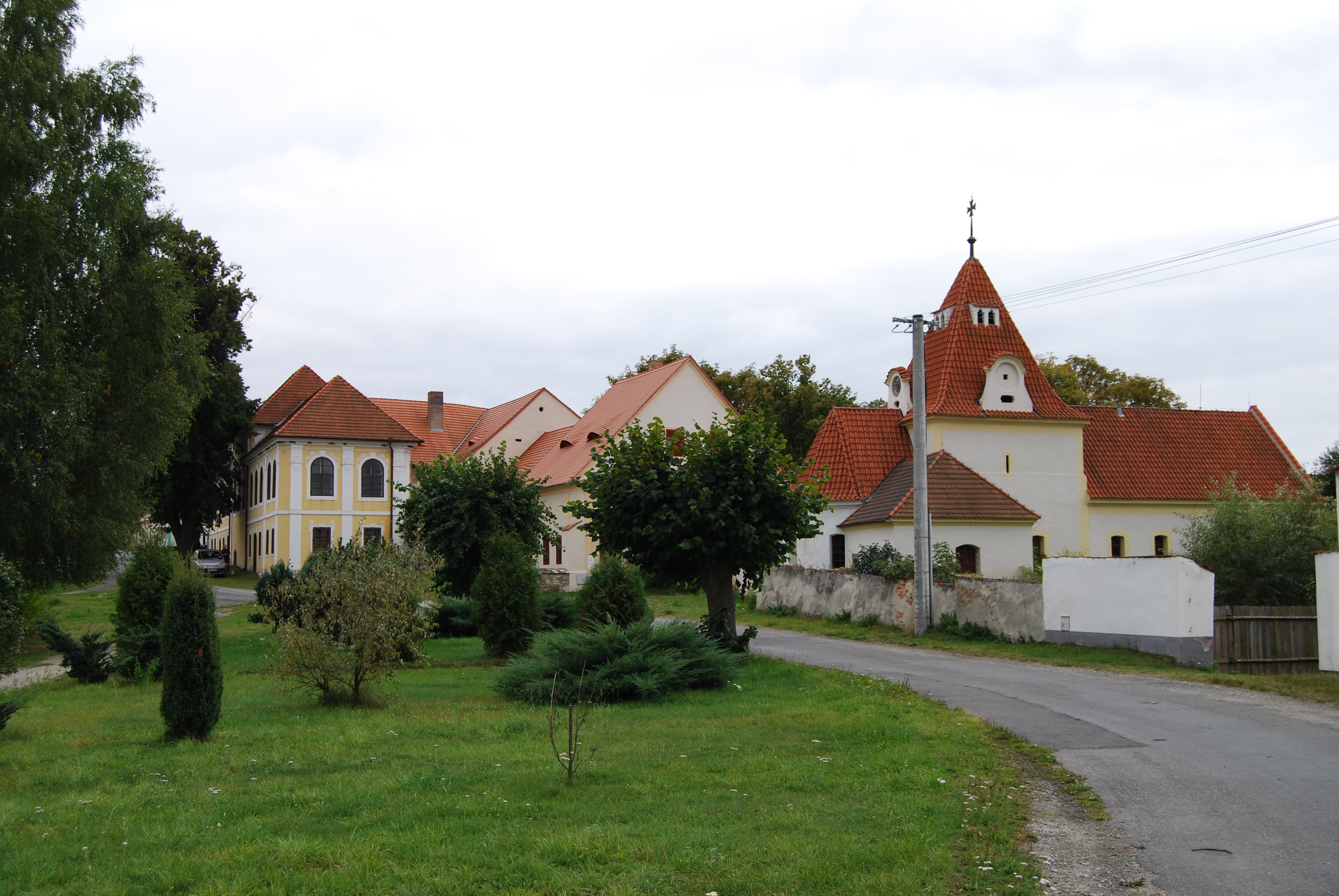
- Church of Saint Catherine and the castle

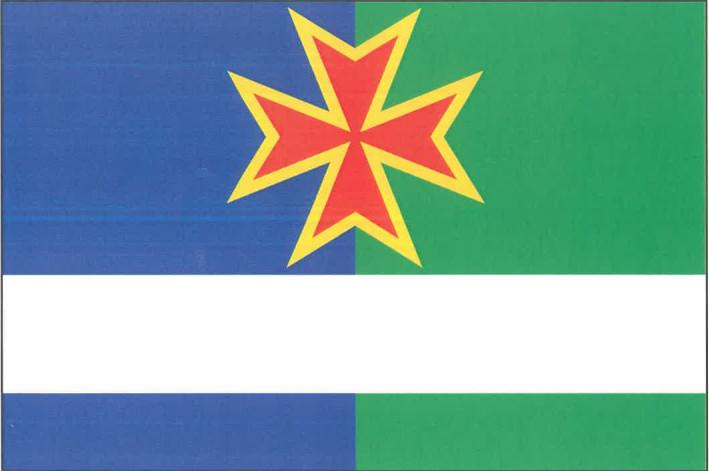
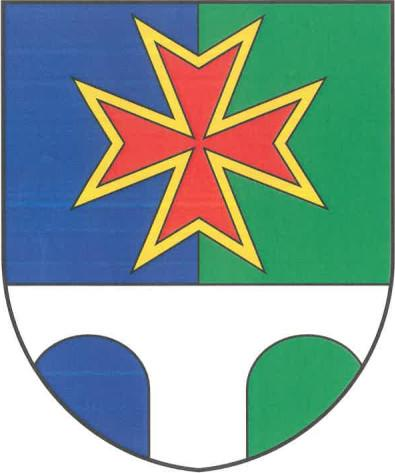
- Flag Coat of arms

- Location in the Czech Republic
- Coordinates: 49°26′20″N 14°8′33″E
- Country: Czech Republic
- Region: South Bohemian
- District: Písek
- First mentioned: 1387

Area
  - Total: 25.16 km^{2} (9.71 sq mi)
- Elevation: 426 m (1,398 ft)

Population (2026-01-01)
  - Total: 197
  - Density: 7.83/km^{2} (20.3/sq mi)
- Time zone: UTC+1 (CET)
  - Summer (DST): UTC+2 (CEST)
- Postal code: 397 01
- Website: www.varvazov-obec.cz

Varvažov is a municipality and village in Písek District in the South Bohemian Region of the Czech Republic. It has about 200 inhabitants. The historic centre of the village is well preserved and is protected as a village monument zone.

== Administrative division ==
Varvažov consists of three municipal parts (in brackets population according to the 2021 census):

- Varvažov (144)
- Štědronín-Plazy (20)
- Zbonín (28)

== Etymology ==
The origin of the name Varvažov is unclear. There is a theory that the name was derived from the Middle High German word arwis ('pea').

== Geography ==
Varvažov is located about 14 kilometres (9 mi) north of Písek and 67 km (42 mi) south of Prague. It lies in the Tábor Uplands. The highest point is the flat hill Hlásnice at 447 m (1,467 ft) above sea level.

Most of the municipal border is formed by rivers. The western border is formed by the Skalice River. After its confluence with the Skalice, the southern border is formed by the Lomnice. After its confluence with the Lomnice, the eastern border is formed by the Otava, and then, again after their confluence, it continues as the Vltava River. The Orlík Reservoir, built on the Vltava, begins in the northeastern part of the municipality.

== History ==
The first written mention of Varvažov is from 1387. However, the existence of the village is documented as early as the mid-13th century. Until the middle of the 19th century, the village was continuously a property of the Knights Hospitaller.

== Demographics ==
Historical population

Year	Pop.	±%
1869	1,511	—
1880	1,459	−3.4%
1890	1,361	−6.7%
1900	1,192	−12.4%
1910	1,049	−12.0%

Year	Pop.	±%
1921	1,044	−0.5%
1930	903	−13.5%
1950	591	−34.6%
1961	580	−1.9%
1970	485	−16.4%

Year	Pop.	±%
1980	311	−35.9%
1991	228	−26.7%
2001	176	−22.8%
2011	187	+6.2%
2021	192	+2.7%

Source: Censuses

== Transport ==
There are no railways or major roads passing through the municipality.

== Sights ==
A set of Neoclassical-type homesteads has been preserved in the historic centre of Varvažov, which is protected as a village monument zone. In the centre of the village is a late Baroque castle from the 18th century, which served as a summer residence of the Knights Hospitaller.

The oldest monument is the Church of Saint Catherine, built in the second half of the 13th century. A notable monument is also a historic stone bridge from the 18th century.

== In popular culture ==
The 1998 award-winning film Sekal Has to Die was shot in the municipality.

== Notable people ==
- Josef Bílý (1872–1941), general
