= Ludwinowo, Żuromin County =

Ludwinowo
- Settlement
- Location within Poland
- Coordinates: 52°57′19″N 19°57′49″E
- Country: Poland
- Voivodeship: Masovian
- County: Żuromin
- Gmina: Bieżuń

Ludwinowo [ludviˈnɔvɔ] is a settlement in the administrative district of Gmina Bieżuń, within Żuromin County, Masovian Voivodeship, in east-central Poland.
