= Familiants Law =

18th and 19th-century laws in Czech lands

Familianten or Familianten Gesetz was the German term commonly used for the laws and the related record books which regulated the number of Jewish families in the Czech lands in the 18th and 19th centuries.

== Background ==
It was the avowed policy of the government to prevent any increase in the number of Jewish residents in the Czech provinces. When Maria Theresa revoked her edict expelling the Jews from these provinces (1745), it was on the condition that their number should not be increased; even her son Joseph II reasserted (1780–90) the condition. In 1787 a census was taken which showed the number of Jewish families in Bohemia (8,541) and Moravia (5,106). The number permitted in Bohemia was increased to 8,600, in Moravia to 5,400, while in Austrian Silesia 119 were permitted. In Moravia the number of Familianten was distributed according to congregations, the largest being Nikolsburg with 620; in Bohemia and Austrian Silesia the Familiant was allowed to settle under the same conditions as were other Jews.

The number of marriage permits issued was limited to the number of deaths among the Familianten. An applicant for a permit was required to give surety for the payment of three years' taxes, to prove that he possessed at least 300 florins, to show that he had received a school education, to pass an examination in Jewish religion according to Herz Homberg's text-book, "Bene Zion," and to give evidence that he was at least twenty-four years of age. A first-born son, a school-teacher, or a veteran of the army had precedence over other candidates. The license was issued either by the county or by the provincial authorities (Kreisamt or Gubernium).

Besides the ordinary Familianten there were those who, in recognition of special merit, were permitted to marry as "supernumeraries". It was a rule, however, that they should be given the first license vacated by death. The law of Francis I (Aug. 3, 1797) permitted Jews who had served as volunteers in the army or who lived exclusively by agriculture or by technical skill to marry without regard to the number of established families. Those who married according to the Jewish law and without license were called Magranten (emigrants), because in order to be legally married they had to emigrate. Their weddings were called "garret-weddings". This law was abolished by the constitution of March 4, 1849, which made all civil and political rights independent of religious belief. It was, however, revived in a different form by a law of March 19, 1853, which declared that section 124 of the civil code, demanding a court license (kreisamtliche Bewilligung) for a Jewish marriage, had not been abrogated by the constitution. The difference between this and the former condition was only the abolition of the fixed number. This law was repealed Nov. 29, 1859.

== Legacy ==
One other result of the Familianten laws was that the government maintained very precise records of which families lived in which towns. The list of Familianten were collected in the Book of Jewish Familianten (also called "Mannschaftsbücher" in Moravia). Records were collected in 1799 and in 1811 and updated until about 1830. Each record comprised the name of county, registration number of the family in the whole land (based on "copulatio consensus"), the registration number of the family in the county (set up in 1725), name of the father, his wife, his sons and a few other family details.

== Bibliography ==
- Hermann, Geschichte der Juden in Böhmen, pp. 86 et seq., Vienna and Prague, 1819.
- Scari, Systematische Darstellung der in Betreff der Juden in Mähren und im K. K. Antheil von Schlesien Erlassenen Gesetze und Verordnungen, pp. 3 et seq., Brünn, 1835.
- Frankl-Grün, Geschichte der Juden in Kremsier, i. 171, ii. 22, Breslau, 1896, and Frankfort-on-the-Main, 1898.
