= Březnice (Příbram District) =

Town in the Czech Republic

- Town
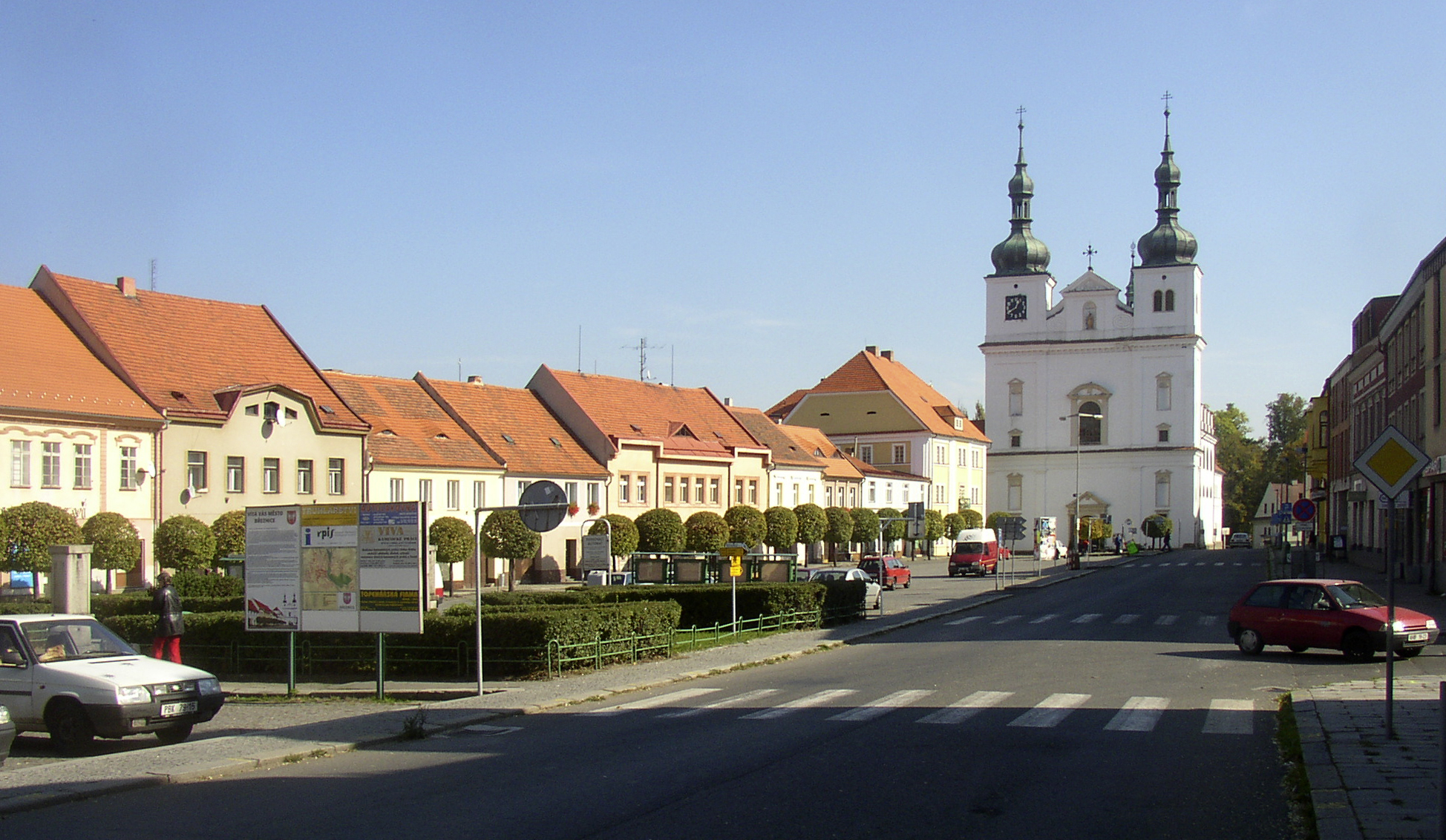
- Town square with the Church of Saints Francis Xavier and Ignatius of Loyola

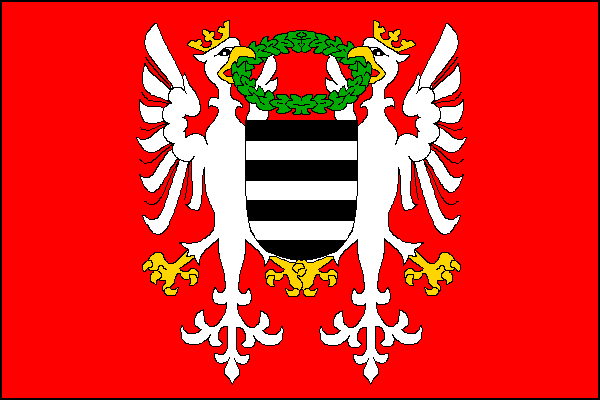
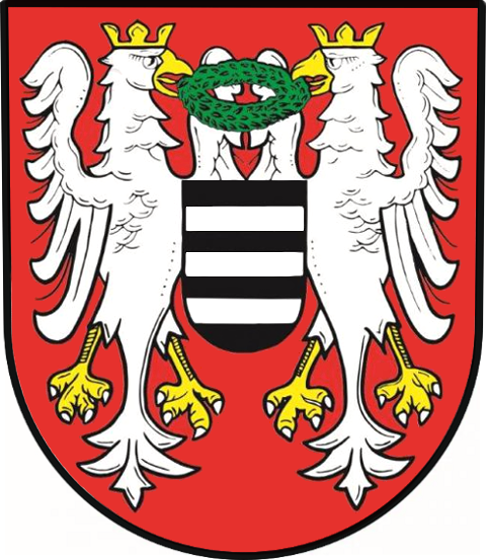
- Flag Coat of arms

- Location in the Czech Republic
- Coordinates: 49°33′31″N 13°57′15″E
- Country: Czech Republic
- Region: Central Bohemian
- District: Příbram
- First mentioned: 1224

Government
  - Mayor: Petr Procházka

Area
  - Total: 19.47 km^{2} (7.52 sq mi)
- Elevation: 462 m (1,516 ft)

Population (2026-01-01)
  - Total: 3,546
  - Density: 182.1/km^{2} (471.7/sq mi)
- Time zone: UTC+1 (CET)
  - Summer (DST): UTC+2 (CEST)
- Postal code: 262 72
- Website: www.breznice.cz

Březnice (Czech pronunciation: [ˈbr̝ɛzɲɪtsɛ]; German: Bresnitz) is a town in Příbram District in the Central Bohemian Region of the Czech Republic. It has about 3,500 inhabitants. The town is located on the Skalice River in the Benešov Uplands. The historic town centre is well preserved and is protected as an urban monument zone. The most important monument is the Březnice Castle, protected as a national cultural monument.

== Administrative division ==
Březnice consists of six municipal parts (in brackets population according to the 2021 census):

- Březnice (3,197)
- Bor (67)
- Dobrá Voda (45)
- Martinice (51)
- Přední Poříčí (49)
- Zadní Poříčí (24)

== Etymology ==
The name of the town is probably derived from Březná, which was the former name of the stream that flowed through the birch forest (from the Czech word bříza, i.e. 'birch').

== Geography ==
Březnice is located about 13 kilometres (8 mi) south of Příbram and 61 km (38 mi) southwest of Prague. It lies in the Benešov Uplands. The highest point is the hill Vinice at 538 m (1,765 ft) above sea level. The Skalice River flows through the town.

== History ==
The first written mention of Březnice is from 1224, when Budislav of Březnice was a member of the royal council. In 1327, Březnice was first referred to as a market town. Until the Battle of the White Mountain, it was a small market town. In 1621, Březnice was acquired by Přibík Jeníšek of Újezd, who together with his wife started the construction development, founded a Jesuit college and had a new church built.

During the Thirty Years' War, the town was not damaged much, and continued to develop after the war, especially in the 18th century. The Jewish ghetto was founded in 1726. In 1728, Březnice was inherited by the Kolowrat family. In 1872, the town was inherited by the Pálffy family, who owned it until 1945. For centuries, Březnice was an agricultural town. In 1875, the railway was built, and industry began to develop slowly. Between 1918 and 1931, several factories were established.

== Demographics ==
Historical population

Year	Pop.	±%
1869	3,354	—
1880	3,534	+5.4%
1890	3,312	−6.3%
1900	3,149	−4.9%
1910	3,058	−2.9%

Year	Pop.	±%
1921	2,818	−7.8%
1930	2,926	+3.8%
1950	2,836	−3.1%
1961	3,196	+12.7%
1970	3,196	+0.0%

Year	Pop.	±%
1980	3,808	+19.1%
1991	3,614	−5.1%
2001	3,659	+1.2%
2011	3,586	−2.0%
2021	3,433	−4.3%

Source: Censuses

== Economy ==
Březnice is home to the Herold Brewery, which sold its beer under the Herold brand name. However, in 2025, the brewery ceased production for economic reasons.

== Transport ==
The I/19 road from Plzeň to Tábor runs through the town.

Březnice is located on the major railway line Prague–České Budějovice and on the line Beroun–Blatná.

== Sights ==
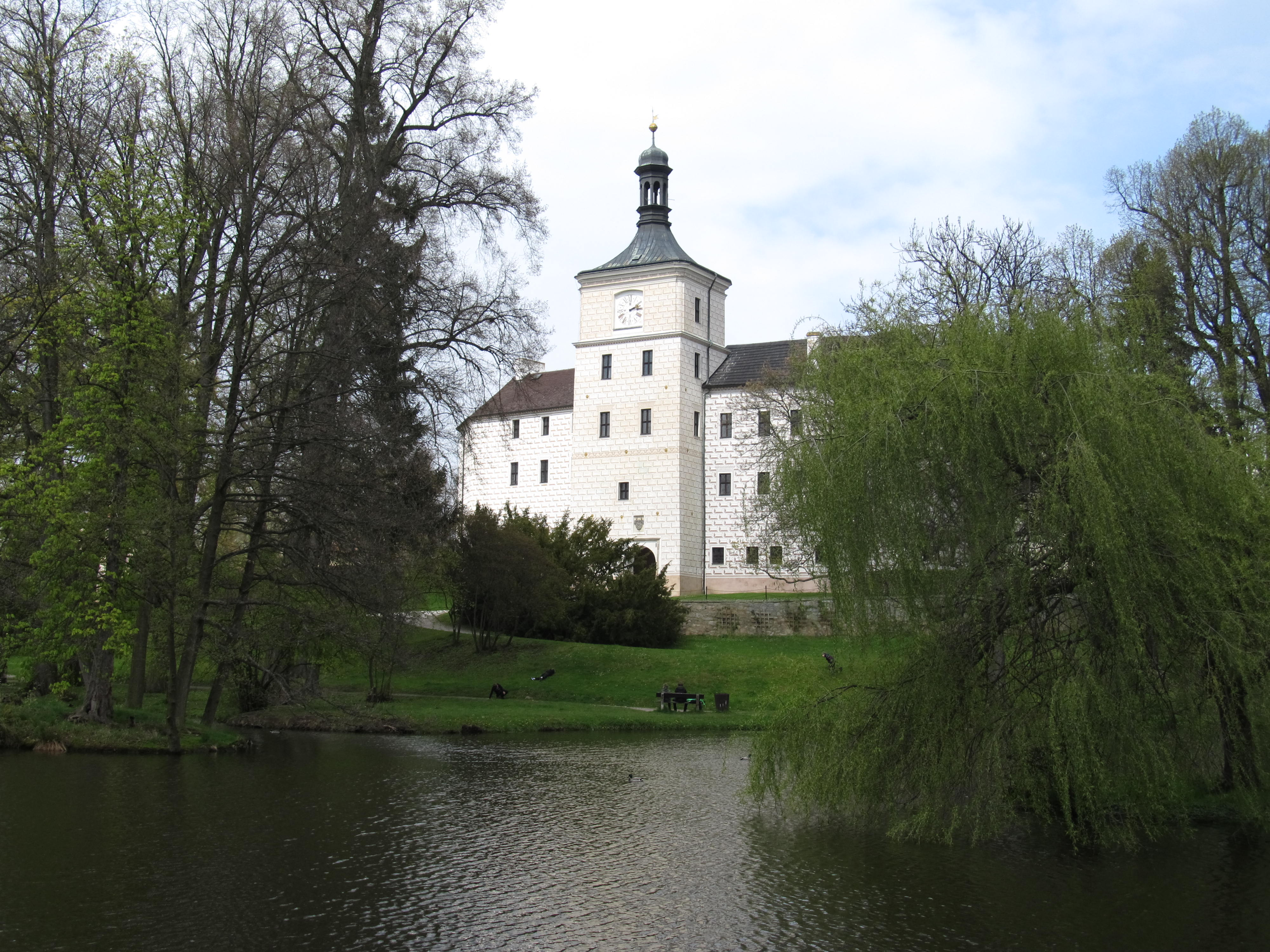
Březnice Castle with its park

Březnice is known for the Březnice Castle, protected as a national cultural monument. It was built as a Gothic fortress in the 13th century and rebuilt in the Renaissance style in the second half of the 16th century. In the 17th century, early Baroque modifications were made, but the castle did not lose its Renaissance character. The castle is surrounded by a Renaissance garden and an English landscape park. Historically significant is its library from 1558, one of the oldest in Bohemia. Today the castle is owned by the state and is open to the public.

The Church of Saints Francis Xavier and Ignatius of Loyola is a landmark of historical town centre. It was built by Carlo Lurago in 1642–1650. It includes many valuable paintings and carved sculptures.

The Jewish ghetto is a unique urban complex with preserved Neoclassical houses. The synagogue was built in 1726–1728 and rebuilt in 1874. Březnice served as an important cultural and social centre for Jewish population in a wide area. There is also a Jewish cemetery in the town.

== Notable people ==
- Joachim Edler von Popper (1722–1795), merchant, banker and manufacturer
- Václav Pichl (1741–1805), composer; served here
- Albert Popper (1808–1889), physician and politician
- Jiří Veselý (born 1993), tennis player

== Twin towns – sister cities ==
Březnice is twinned with:

- Lindow, Germany
