= Kobyly, Bardejov District =

Kobyly
- Municipality
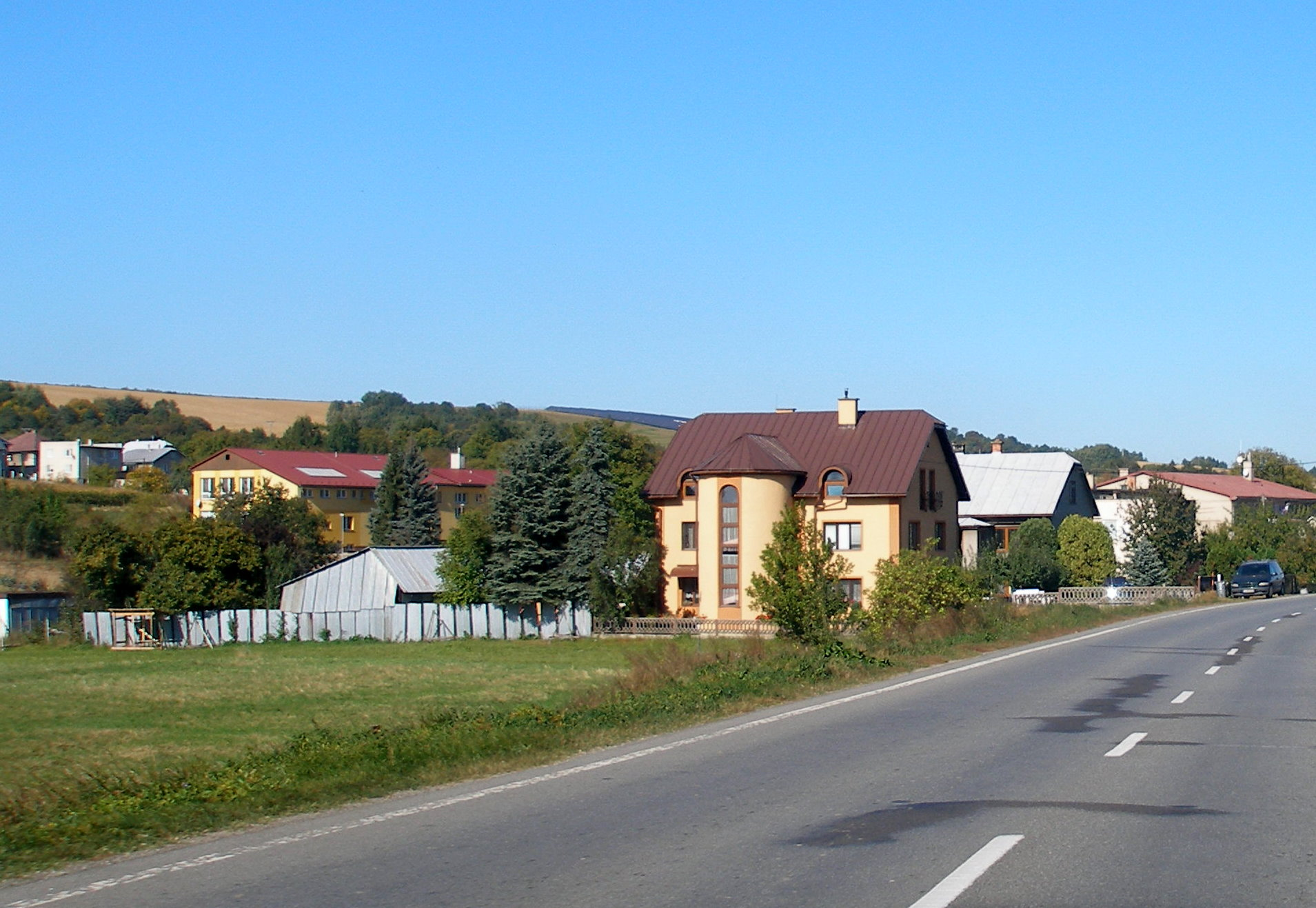

- Flag

- Location of Kobyly in the Prešov Region Location of Kobyly in Slovakia
- Coordinates: 49.22°N 21.30°E
- Country: Slovakia
- Region: Prešov Region
- District: Bardejov District
- First mentioned: 1277

Area
  - Total: 12.45 km^{2} (4.81 sq mi)
- Elevation: 362 m (1,188 ft)

Population (2025)
  - Total: 899
- Time zone: UTC+1 (CET)
  - Summer (DST): UTC+2 (CEST)
- Postal code: 862 2
- Area code: +421 54
- Vehicle registration plate (until 2022): BJ
- Website: www.kobyly.eu

Kobyly (Hungarian: Lófalu) is a village and small municipality in Bardejov District in the Prešov Region of north-east Slovakia.

== History ==
In historical records the village was first mentioned in 1277.

== Geography ==
The municipality lies at an altitude of 362 metres (1,188 ft) and covers an area of 12.45 km^{2} (4.81 sq mi) (2025).

== Population ==
Population statistic (10 years)
Year	1995	2005	2015	2025
Count	773	848	865	899
Difference		+9.70%	+2.00%	+3.93%

Population statistic
Year	2024	2025
Count	903	899
Difference		−0.44%

It has a population of 899 people (31 December 2025).

=== Ethnicity ===
Census 2021 (1+ %)
Ethnicity	Number	Fraction
Slovak	849	99.18%
Total	856	

In year 2021 was 856 people by ethnicity 849 as Slovak, 7 as Rusyn, 7 as Not found out, 6 as Other, 3 as Czech and 2 as Ukrainian.

Note on population: The difference values of population numbers in the table "Population statistic" and in the sections "Ethnicity" & "Religion" is caused by the use of various statistical methods.

=== Religion ===
Census 2021 (1+ %)
Religion	Number	Fraction
Roman Catholic Church	744	86.92%
None	44	5.14%
Greek Catholic Church	31	3.62%
Evangelical Church	25	2.92%
Eastern Orthodox Church	9	1.05%
Total	856	

In year 2021 was 856 people by religion 744 from Roman Catholic Church, 44 from None, 31 from Greek Catholic Church, 25 from Evangelical Church, 9 from Eastern Orthodox Church, 2 from Not found out and 1 from Ad hoc movements.

== Genealogical resources ==
The records for genealogical research are available at the state archive "Statny Archiv in Presov, Slovakia"

- Roman Catholic church records (births/marriages/deaths): 1755-1895 (parish A)
- Greek Catholic church records (births/marriages/deaths): 1854-1901 (parish B)
- Lutheran church records (births/marriages/deaths): 1703-1895 (parish B)

== See also ==
- List of municipalities and towns in Slovakia
