= Strzeszewo, Żuromin County =

Strzeszewo
- Village
- Location within Poland
- Coordinates: 52°59′28″N 19°53′4″E
- Country: Poland
- Voivodeship: Masovian
- County: Żuromin
- Gmina: Bieżuń
- Population (approx.): 200

Strzeszewo [stʂɛˈʂɛvɔ] is a village in the administrative district of Gmina Bieżuń, within Żuromin County, Masovian Voivodeship, in east-central Poland.
