= Horosedly =

- Municipality
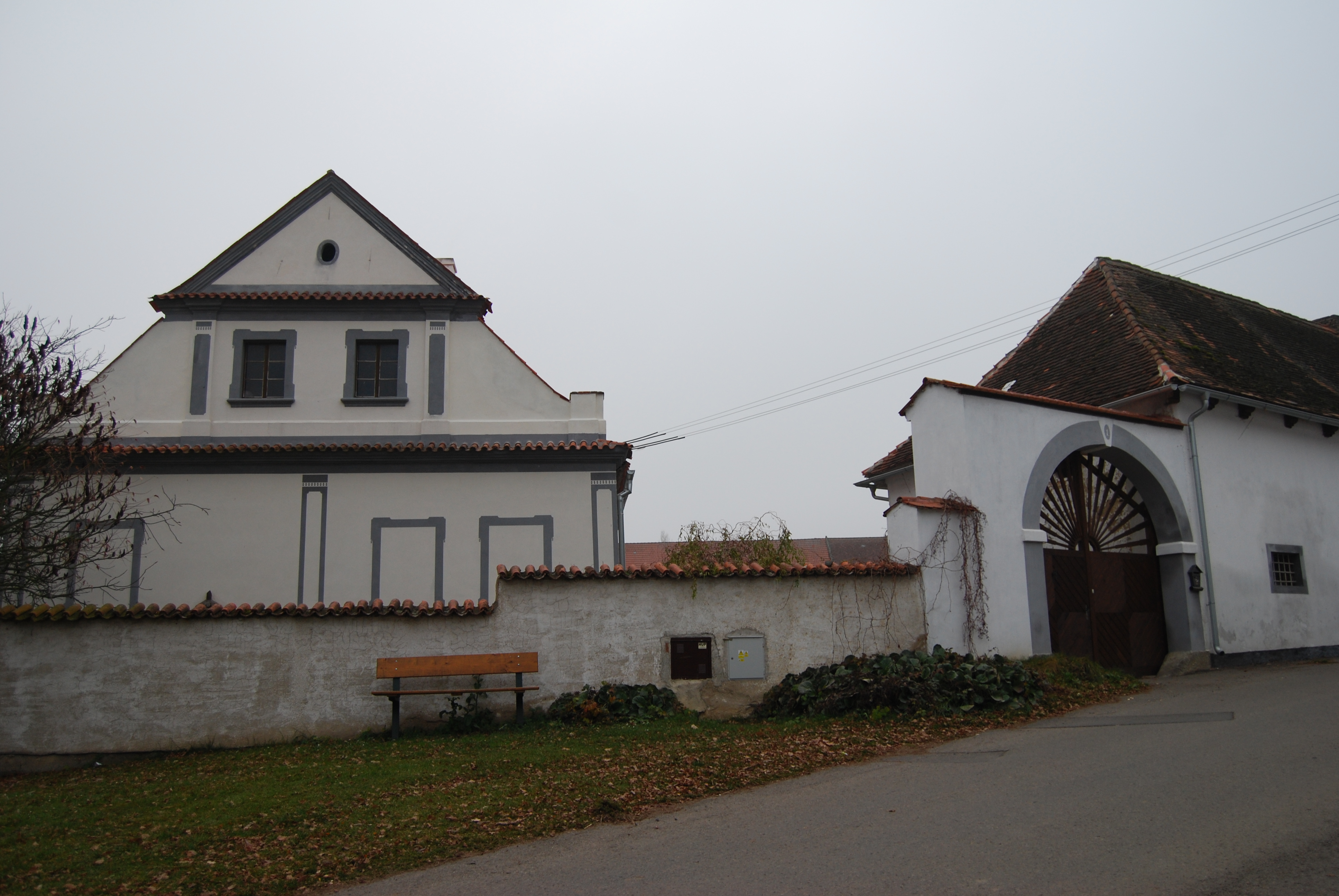
- Manor house

- Flag Coat of arms

- Location in the Czech Republic
- Coordinates: 49°30′46″N 14°3′15″E
- Country: Czech Republic
- Region: South Bohemian
- District: Písek
- First mentioned: 1234

Area
  - Total: 5.77 km^{2} (2.23 sq mi)
- Elevation: 427 m (1,401 ft)

Population (2026-01-01)
  - Total: 165
  - Density: 28.6/km^{2} (74.1/sq mi)
- Time zone: UTC+1 (CET)
  - Summer (DST): UTC+2 (CEST)
- Postal code: 398 06
- Website: www.horosedly.cz

Horosedly is a municipality and village in Písek District in the South Bohemian Region of the Czech Republic. It has about 200 inhabitants.

Horosedly lies approximately 25 kilometres (16 mi) north of Písek, 68 km (42 mi) north-west of České Budějovice, and 69 km (43 mi) south-west of Prague.

== Demographics ==
Historical population
Year	Pop.	±%
1869	428	—
1880	440	+2.8%
1890	385	−12.5%
1900	350	−9.1%
1910	351	+0.3%
1921	351	+0.0%
1930	348	−0.9%
1950	271	−22.1%
1961	237	−12.5%
1970	188	−20.7%
1980	128	−31.9%
1991	131	+2.3%
2001	112	−14.5%
2011	123	+9.8%
2021	145	+17.9%
Source: Censuses
