= Myslín =

- Municipality
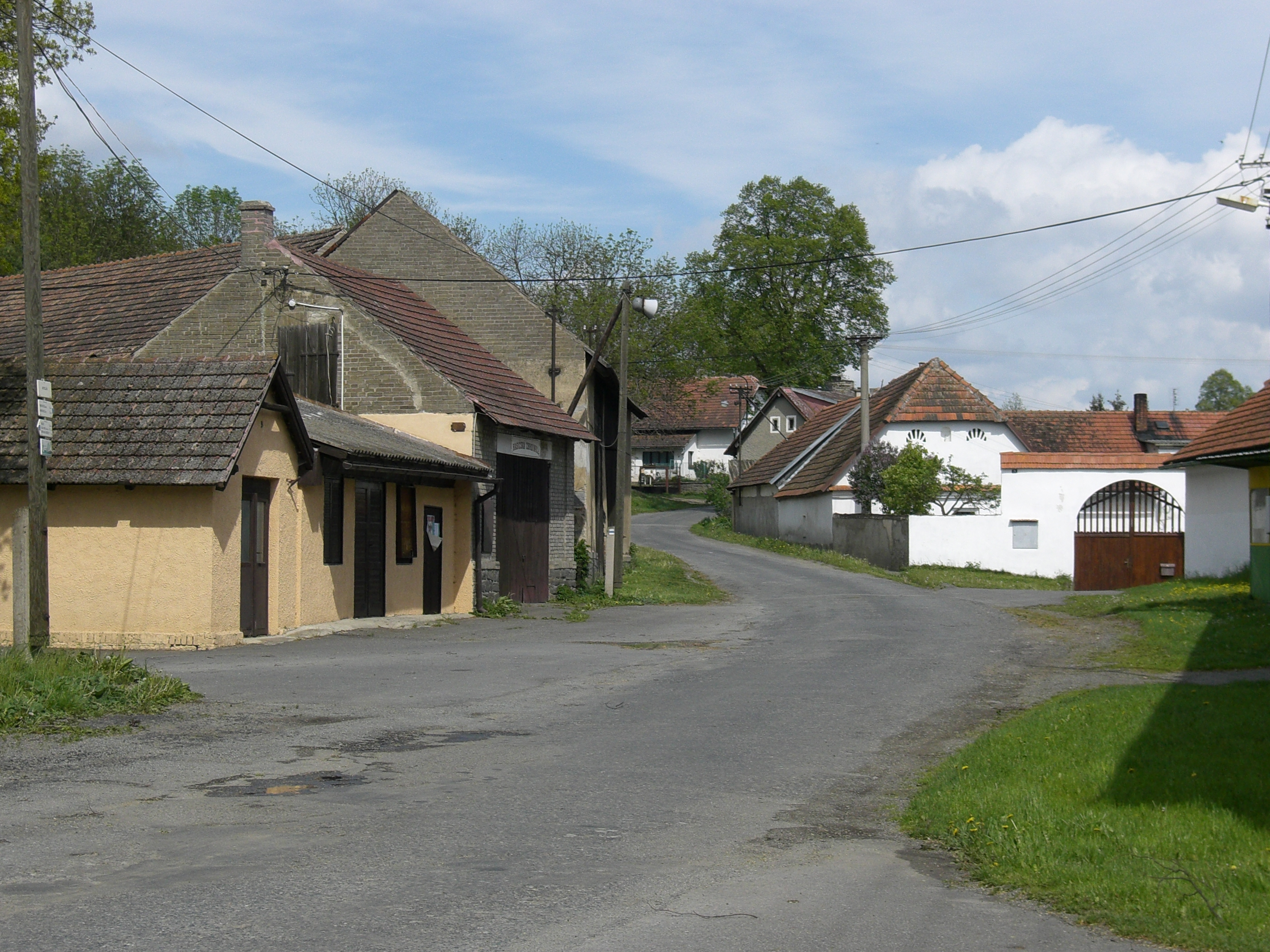
- Main street

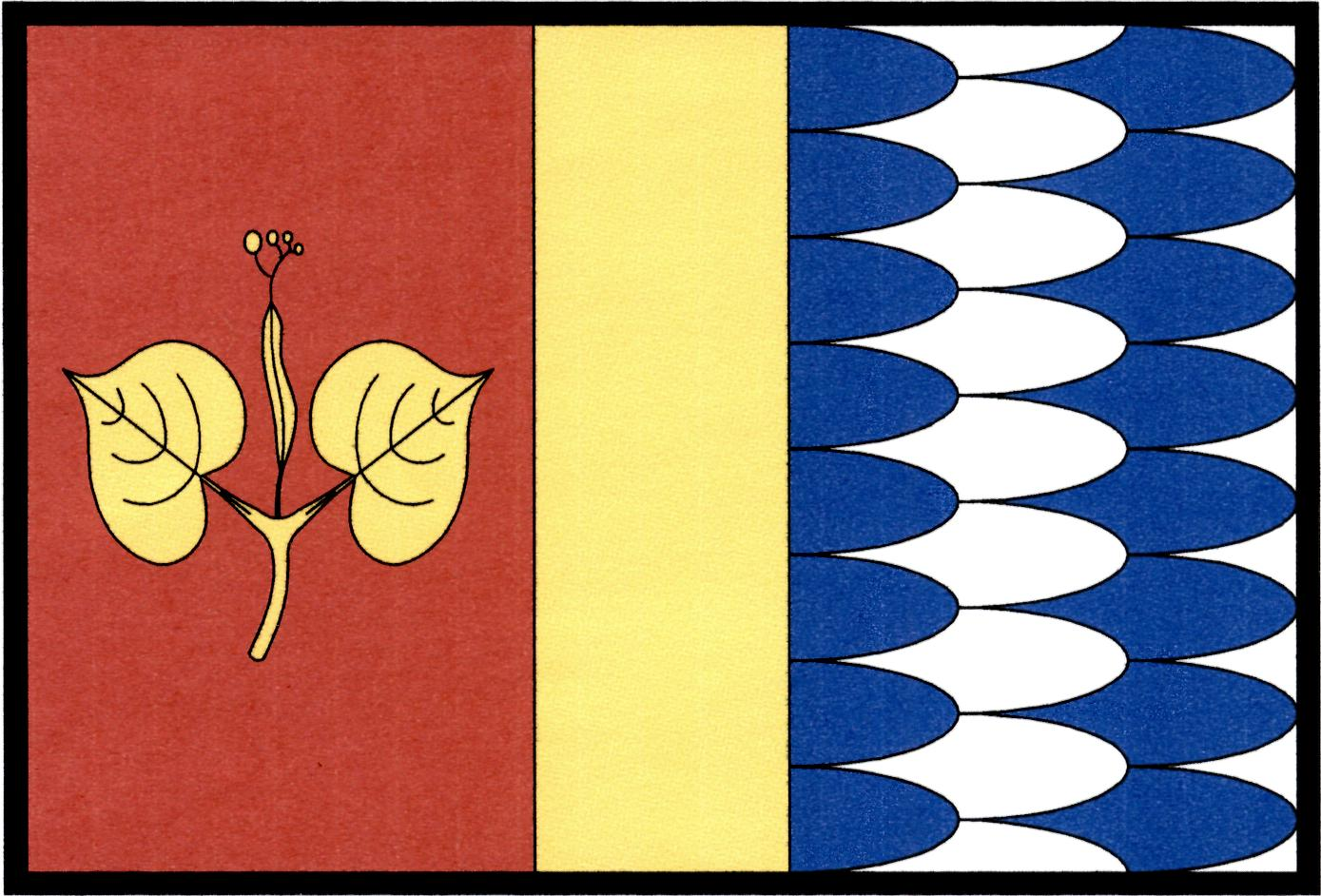
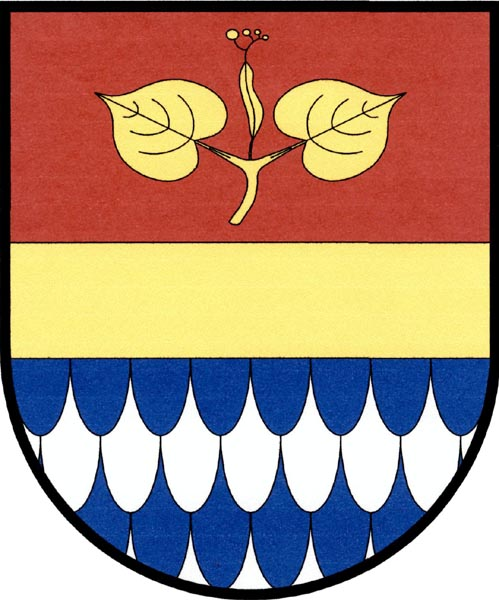
- Flag Coat of arms

- Location in the Czech Republic
- Coordinates: 49°31′56″N 14°1′39″E
- Country: Czech Republic
- Region: South Bohemian
- District: Písek
- First mentioned: 1239

Area
  - Total: 4.15 km^{2} (1.60 sq mi)
- Elevation: 439 m (1,440 ft)

Population (2026-01-01)
  - Total: 95
  - Density: 23/km^{2} (59/sq mi)
- Time zone: UTC+1 (CET)
  - Summer (DST): UTC+2 (CEST)
- Postal code: 398 04
- Website: www.myslin-obec.cz

Myslín is a municipality and village in Písek District in the South Bohemian Region of the Czech Republic. It has about 100 inhabitants.

Myslín lies approximately 27 kilometres (17 mi) north of Písek, 70 km (43 mi) north-west of České Budějovice, and 68 km (42 mi) south-west of Prague.

== Demographics ==
Historical population
Year	Pop.	±%
1869	313	—
1880	310	−1.0%
1890	300	−3.2%
1900	282	−6.0%
1910	270	−4.3%
1921	288	+6.7%
1930	270	−6.2%
1950	182	−32.6%
1961	169	−7.1%
1970	152	−10.1%
1980	141	−7.2%
1991	114	−19.1%
2001	90	−21.1%
2011	96	+6.7%
2021	88	−8.3%
Source: Censuses
