= Ossowski =

Ossowski (feminine: Ossowska; plural: Ossowscy) or Osowski or Osovski or Osovskiy (feminine: Osowska or Osovskaya; plural: Osowscy) is the surname of several aristocratic families of Poland. It may refer to:

== People ==
=== Individuals ===
- Alexander Ossovsky (1871–1957), Russian composer and musicologist
- Arkadiusz Ossowski (born 1996), Polish handball player
- Douglas Osowski (born 1969), American voice actor and writer
- John Ossowski (born 1962), Canadian rower
- Leonie Ossowski, pen name of Jolanthe von Brandenstein (1925–2019), German writer
- Maria Ossowska (1896–1974), Polish sociologist
- Mark Osowski (1963–2004), American basketball coach
- Stanisław Ossowski (1897–1963), Polish sociologist
- Ted Ossowski (1922–1965), American football player
- Władysław Ossowski (1925–2000), Polish resistance member

=== Families ===
==== Ossowski ====
- Ossowski family, Coat of arms of Abdank
- Ossowski family, Coat of arms of Abschatz
- Ossowski family, Coat of arms of Brochwicz
- Ossowski family, Coat of arms of Dołęga
- Ossowski family, Coat of arms of Gryf
- Ossowski family, Coat of arms of Prus I
- Ossowski family, Coat of arms of Rola
- Ossowski family, Coat of arms of Ulina

==== Osowski ====
- Osowski family, Coat of arms of Dołęga
- Osowski family, Coat of arms of Rola
- Osowski family, Coat of arms of Ulina

== See also ==
- Osofsky, a surname
