= Ossowski (Dołęga) =

Polish surname

Dołęga Coat of Arms

The surname Ossowski (singular masculine), Ossowska (singular feminine), or Ossowscy (plural) (also Osowski / Osowska / Osowscy) belongs to a Polish noble family. The name derives from the Polish place-name Ossowy, with the suffix -ski indicating land-ownership or lordship. Variants of the name include Ossowskiego, Ossowskich, and Ossowskliéj; the German or Prussian equivalent sometimes appears as von Ossowski. The family originally belonged to the clan Dołęga but began to use the present surname in the 14th or 15th century.

== History ==
The Ossowski family is believed to have originated from Poznań in the 13/14th century (see talk page). There they were in service to the Senat, with royal appointments under the Przywilej koszycki, held for life and only subject to recall upon conviction of high treason. Later the family spread from Poznań to found several villages around Poznań and Wschowa, where Hincza Ossowski and his son military General Mikolaj Dołęga-Ossowski founded the Village of Osowa Sień.

According to legend, King Boleslaw Krzywousty (1102–1139) won a victory over the Prussians with the help of a bowman named Dołęga, inspiring a popular uprising. Dołęga was rewarded with an arrow as an augmentation to his Pobóg arms, and the resulting coat of arms was named after him. The Dołęga clan was famous for the precision of their bowmen and the bravery of their cavalry. The Ossowskis was one of the first families to receive the title, and may have connections to this legendary knight.

Jan Dołęga-Ossowski is believed to be the founder of the Ossowski noble family (szlachta). He had some connection to John Ossowski of Szczecin-Osów, who received recognition from King Louis I of Hungary for victualling the army when it arrived in his territory in 1374. Komes/Hrabia Dołęga-Ossowski also owned a manor house in the village of Szczecin-Osów and was a member of the Polish Order of the Virtuti Militari.

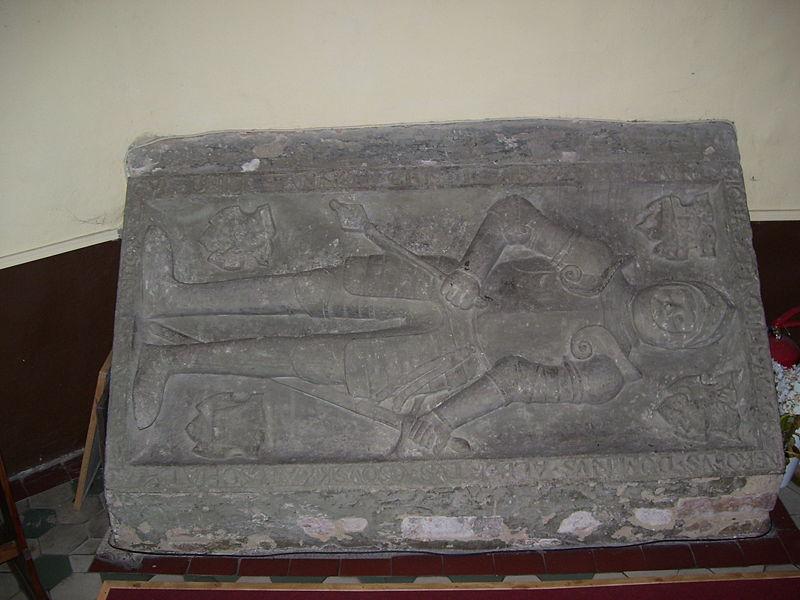
Bishop Albert Ossowski's tomb

Palace of Osowa Sień

In the 15th century the family's holdings expanded; they established the settlement of Osowa Sień near Wschowa, and built the village church of St. Fabian and St. Sebastian. Mikolaj Dołęga-Ossowski was appointed deputy district judge (podsędek ziemski) of Wschowa in 1517, and in 1540 founded the original church of St. Jadwigi in Dębowa Łęka. The Renaissance tomb of Bishop Albert Ossowski, from 1572, can be seen in a wall of the church.

The village was a divided into three estates: the Upper, Middle and Lower and was often used a stopping point for pilgrims on the Wielkopolska Way of St James. The Upper estate contains the Palace of Osowej Sieni which has been extended and partially rebuilt throughout the centuries. The Middle estate there was the eighteenth-century manor house, but was demolished in the late nineteenth century. The Lower estate contains another manor house, farmland, forests and lakes.

The land was later sold to the Zychlinski family in 16/17th century and in the 19th century to Baron von Seherr-Thoss family. One of the most important battles of the first phase III the Great Northern War took place between Dębowa Łęka and Wschowa. Led by the Tsar of Russia Peter the Great and Augustus II the Strong of Saxony–Poland–Lithuania successfully defeated the Swedish Empire in Northern Europe, Central Europe and Eastern Europe.

The family achieved its greatest importance during the Polish–Lithuanian Commonwealth (1569–1795).

The Ossowski family is believed to have moved (c1600) to Płock, later moving to the villages in the Ossowa area now called Osowa Krzeczanowska, Osowa Łaszewska, and Osowa Drobińska, in the Mazowieckie region of Poland.

During the 17th century some of the Dołęga clan emigrated to Vilna (Vilnius, Lithuania). Their noble title was renewed in Lithuania in 1674 by John III Sobieski, King of the Polish–Lithuanian Commonwealth (1674–1696). When West Prussia was incorporated into Prussia, in 1774, the family's high noble rank was recognised by King Frederick II ("the Great", 1740–1786). The title was renewed again in Poland, in 1825 and 1850, to Kazimierz Jan Dołęga-Ossowski, the last receiver of the title.

== Battles ==
Members of the szlachta had a personal obligation to defend the country with men from their own towns and villages. The basic tactical unit of the army was the Chorągiew, a group of approximately 200 fighting men financed by a noble clan, capable of operating independently with its own support and transport auxiliaries.

The Dołęga-Ossowski Officers (Rotmistrz) who supplied themselves and men for the following battles were:-

- Maciej Dołęga-Ossowski - Livonian campaign of Stephen Báthory Siege of Połotsk (August 1579)
- Wacław Dołęga-Ossowski - Polish–Muscovite War (1605–1618) Kremlin, Moscow (October 1610)
- Stefan Dołęga-Ossowski - Battle of Zboriv (1649) (August 1649)
- Piotr Dołęga-Ossowski - White Orthodox Church (Summer 1651)
- Piotr Dołęga-Ossowski - Battle of Berestechko (June 1651)
- Stanislaw Dołęga-Ossowski - Battle of Batoh, Ukraine (June 1652)

== Family Members ==
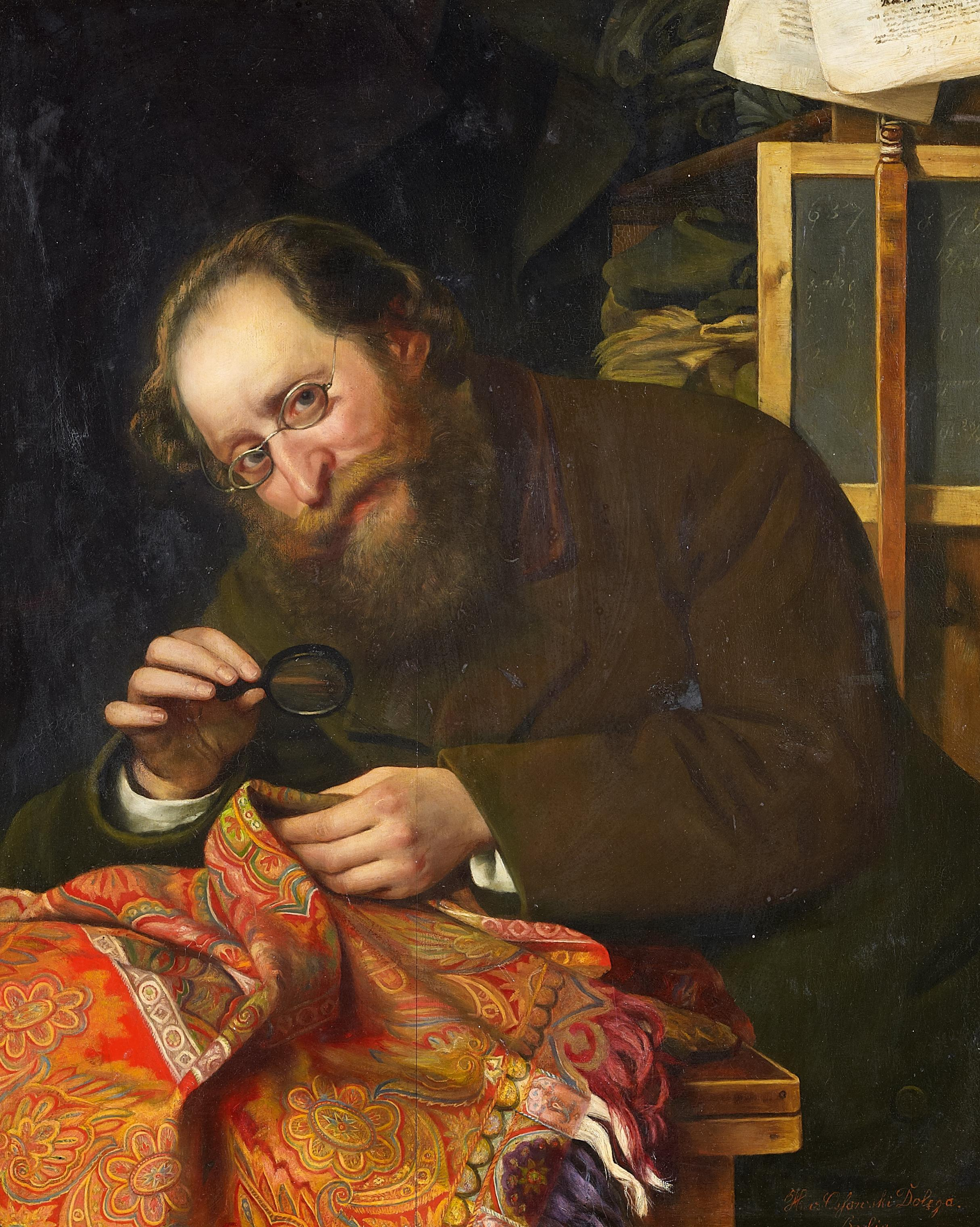
Der Kunstliebhaber (The Art Lover) by H.v. Ossowski Dolega, 1880s

- Mikołaj Dołęga-Ossowski (died 1552), General in Polish Army
- Jeanette Dołęga-Ossowska (born 24 June 1808 in Prussian Stargard)
- Married Count Ludwig von Rittberg (born 23 March 1810 in Stangenberg)

Children:

- Count Georg von Rittberg (21 July 1833 in Danzig – 27 May 1887 in Memel)

Sister:

- Petronela Dołęga-Ossowska (1810–1862)
- Married Józef Pierzchała-Oborski of Obór (Obóry) (born 1797)

Children:

- Aleksander Pierzchała-Oborski
- Teresa Pierzchała-Oborski
- N Pierzchała-Oborski
- Kazimierz Pierzchała-Oborski

Brother:

- Kazimierz Jan Dołęga-Ossowski
- Son: Mieczysław Dołęga-Ossowski (died 1906 in Ukraine)
- Married Helena ???

Other Family

- Patricia Ossowski, Artist/songwriter.
- Dean Ossowski, Most known for his modeling in Hawaii, environmental awareness, and gay rights
- Sierra Osowski, current student in the United States
- Edmund Dolega-Ossowski, UK
- Simon Dolega-Ossowski, Uk
- Evangeline Dolega-Ossowski, UK
- Elspeth Dolega-Ossowski, UK
- Aleksander Kadow, US
- Tyler Ossowski, US
