= Łaszewo =

Łaszewo may refer to:

- Łaszewo, Brodnica County in Kuyavian-Pomeranian Voivodeship (north-central Poland)
- Łaszewo, Świecie County in Kuyavian-Pomeranian Voivodeship (north-central Poland)
- Łaszewo, Masovian Voivodeship (east-central Poland)
- Łaszewo, West Pomeranian Voivodeship (north-west Poland)

== See also ==
- Łaszewo-Wietrznik in Żuromin County, Masovian Voivodeship, in east-central Poland
