= Hetmanice =

- Village
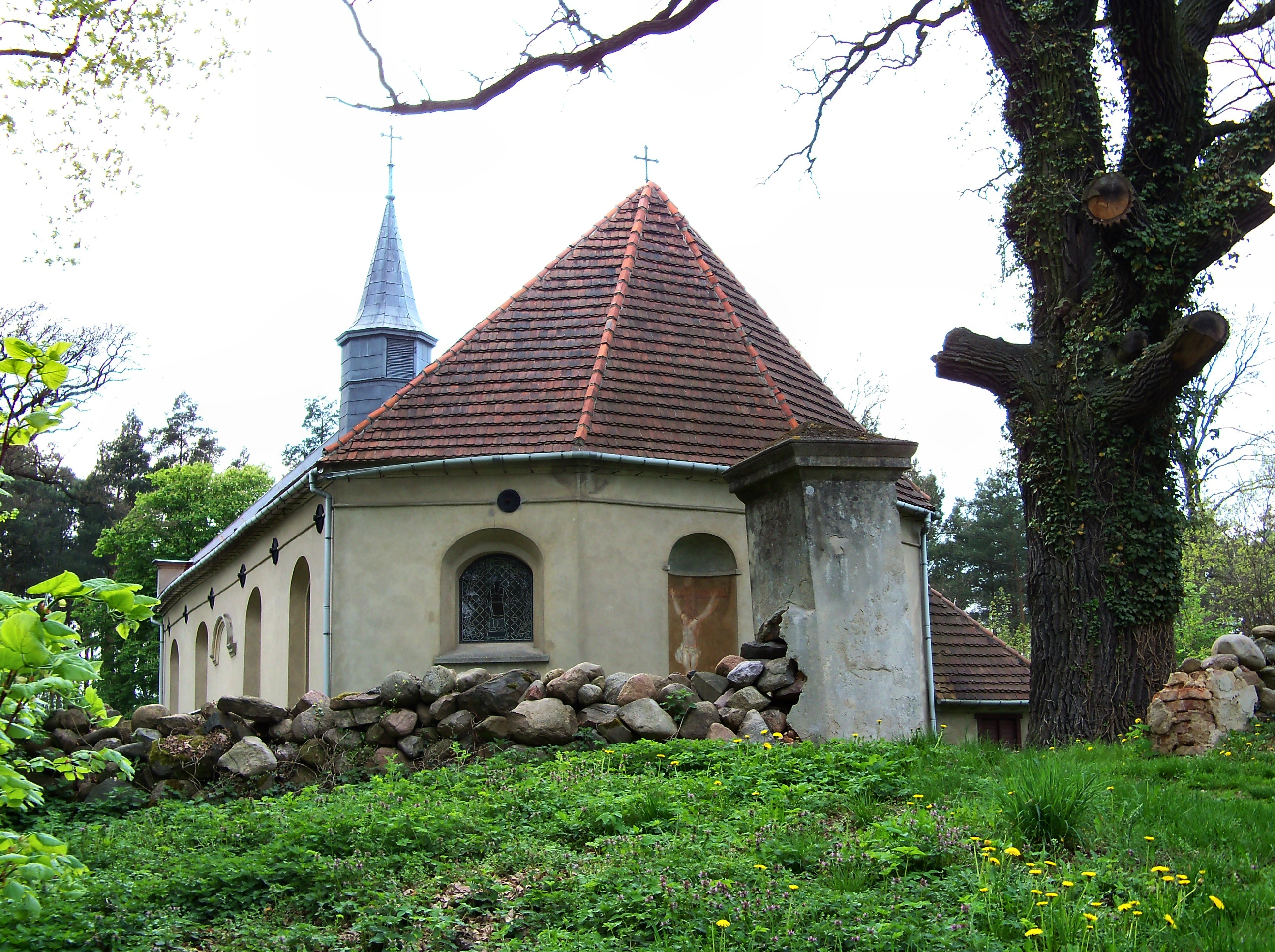
- Church of Saint John the Baptist

- Location within Poland
- Coordinates: 51°51′37″N 16°15′42″E
- Country: Poland
- Voivodeship: Lubusz
- County: Wschowa
- Gmina: Wschowa

Hetmanice [xɛtmaˈnit͡sɛ] is a village in the administrative district of Gmina Wschowa, within Wschowa County, Lubusz Voivodeship, in western Poland. It lies approximately 7 km from Wschowa, and 65 km from Voivodeship capital Zielona Góra.

The history of the village dates back to at least the early 15th century. The earliest known written reference to the settlement dates from 1407, when its name was recorded as Hertmanicze. In subsequent centuries, the name appeared in several different forms, including Henthmanicze (1474), Herthmanycze (1498), and Hethmanicze (1563).

In 1407, Janusz Kromnow Heszerhorn was recorded as the owner of the village. In 1473, the estate belonged to Henryk of Osowa Sień, who acquired it through an exchange of land with Wojciech Górski. By the late 15th century, the village was owned by Małgorzata, the widow of Hincza Lgiński.

In 1520, the estate in Hetmanice was purchased by Piotr Opaliński of Włoszakowice, who subsequently transferred it to his brothers: Łukasz, Sebastian, Jan, and Maciej. In 1566, the property belonged to Andrzej Opaliński.

During the 19th century, the estate passed between several landowning families. In 1841, it was owned by the Kęszycki family of Lgiń, and later passed into the possession of the Henning family. In 1854, Werner Ulrich von Alvensleben-Rogätz married Antonie Henriette Henning. Following his wife’s death, he left the village and moved to Wrocław.
