= Maly Bor =

Maly Bor may refer to:

- Malý Bor, a municipality and village in the Czech Republic
- Mały Bór, Lubusz Voivodeship, a village in Western Poland
- Mały Bór, Warmian-Masurian Voivodeship, a village in Northern Poland
