= Nowopole =

Nowopole may refer to the following places:

- Nowopole, Lesser Poland Voivodeship (south Poland)
- Nowopole, Mława County in Masovian Voivodeship (east-central Poland)
- Nowopole, Żuromin County in Masovian Voivodeship (east-central Poland)
