= Krzaklewski =

Krzaklewski (feminine: Krzaklewska) is a Polish surname.

- Barbara Frączek née Krzaklewska (1941–2023), Polish politician, doctor
- Jacek Krzaklewski (born 1950), Polish musician, guitarist, drummer, and composer
- Marian Krzaklewski (born 1950), Polish politician, trade union activist
