= Frączek =

Dołęga coat of arms used by some of Frączek family

Frączek is a Polish surname. Notable people with the surname include:

- Barbara Frączek (1941–2023), Polish physician and politician
- Jan Frączek (born 1953), Polish canoeist
- Józef Frączek (born 1952), Polish politician, member of the Sejm and Senat
- Shemeck Fraczek (fl. 2013), Fusion Orchestra bass player
