= Karolinowo =

Karolinowo may refer to the following places:

- Karolinowo, Kuyavian-Pomeranian Voivodeship (north-central Poland)
- Karolinowo, Gmina Nowe Miasto in Masovian Voivodeship (east-central Poland)
- Karolinowo, Gmina Załuski in Masovian Voivodeship (east-central Poland)
- Karolinowo, Żuromin County in Masovian Voivodeship (east-central Poland)
