= Klucz =

Klucz (Polish for "key") may refer to:

- Klucz, Szczecin, a municipal neighborhood of the city of Szczecin, Pomerania
- Klucz, Lubusz Voivodeship, Gmina Wschowa, Lubusz Voivodeship, Neumark
- Klucz, Opole Voivodeship, Gmina Ujazd, Strzelce County, Opole Voivodeship, Silesia
- Klucz (Jaworzno), a district of Jaworzno
