= Siemiątkowo-Rechty =

- Village
- Location within Poland
- Coordinates: 52°52′45″N 20°02′35″E
- Country: Poland
- Voivodeship: Masovian
- County: Żuromin
- Gmina: Siemiątkowo

Siemiątkowo-Rechty [ɕɛmjɔntˈkɔvɔ ˈrɛxtɨ] is a village in the administrative district of Gmina Siemiątkowo, within Żuromin County, Masovian Voivodeship, in east-central Poland.
