= Nowa Wieś, Wschowa County =

Nowa Wieś
- Village
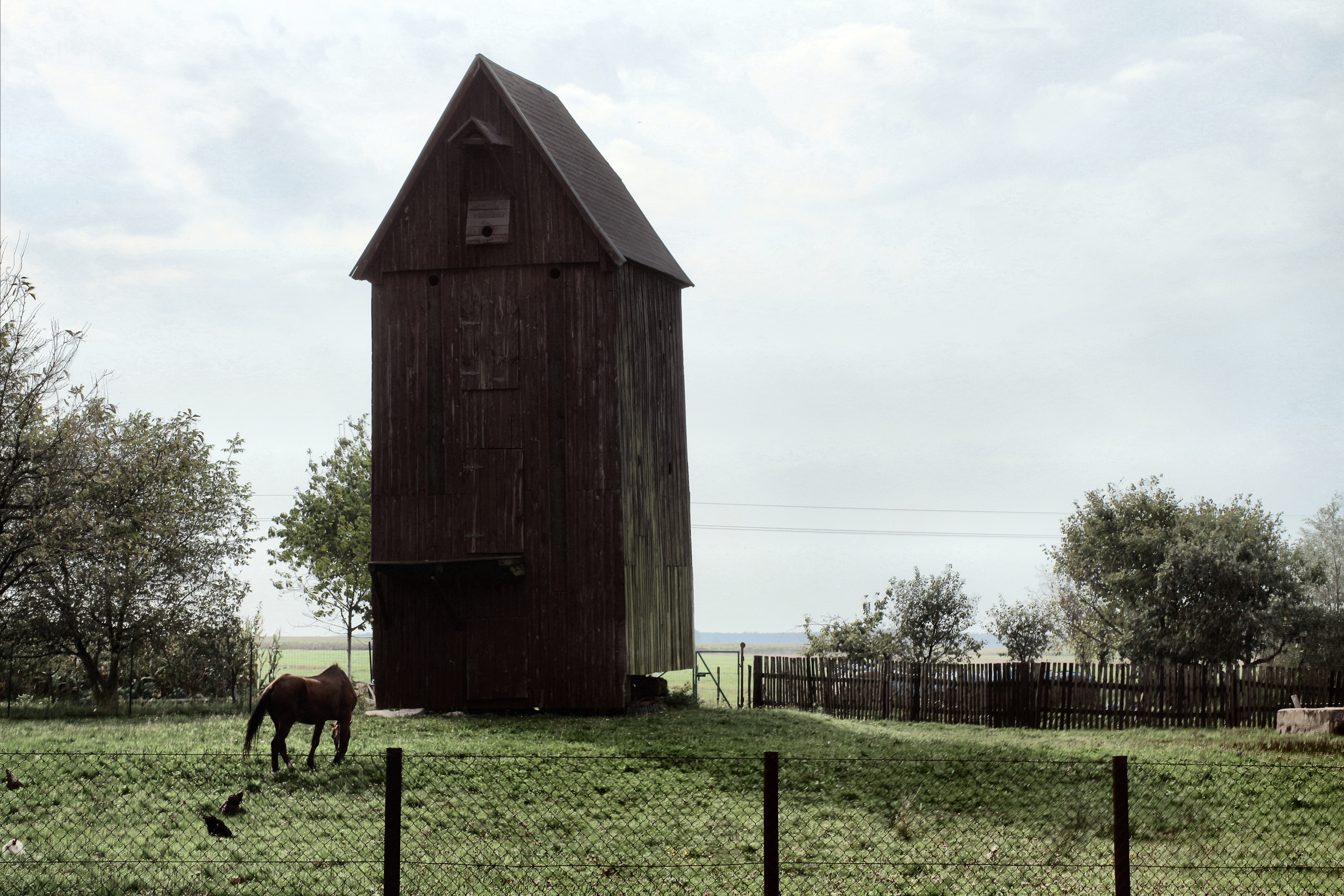
- Windmill in Nowa Wieś

- Location within Poland
- Coordinates: 51°50′14″N 16°17′05″E
- Country: Poland
- Voivodeship: Lubusz
- County: Wschowa
- Gmina: Wschowa

Nowa Wieś [ˈnɔva ˈvjɛɕ] (German: Neudorf) is a village in the administrative district of Gmina Wschowa, within Wschowa County, Lubusz Voivodeship, in western Poland.
