= Łęgoń =

- Village
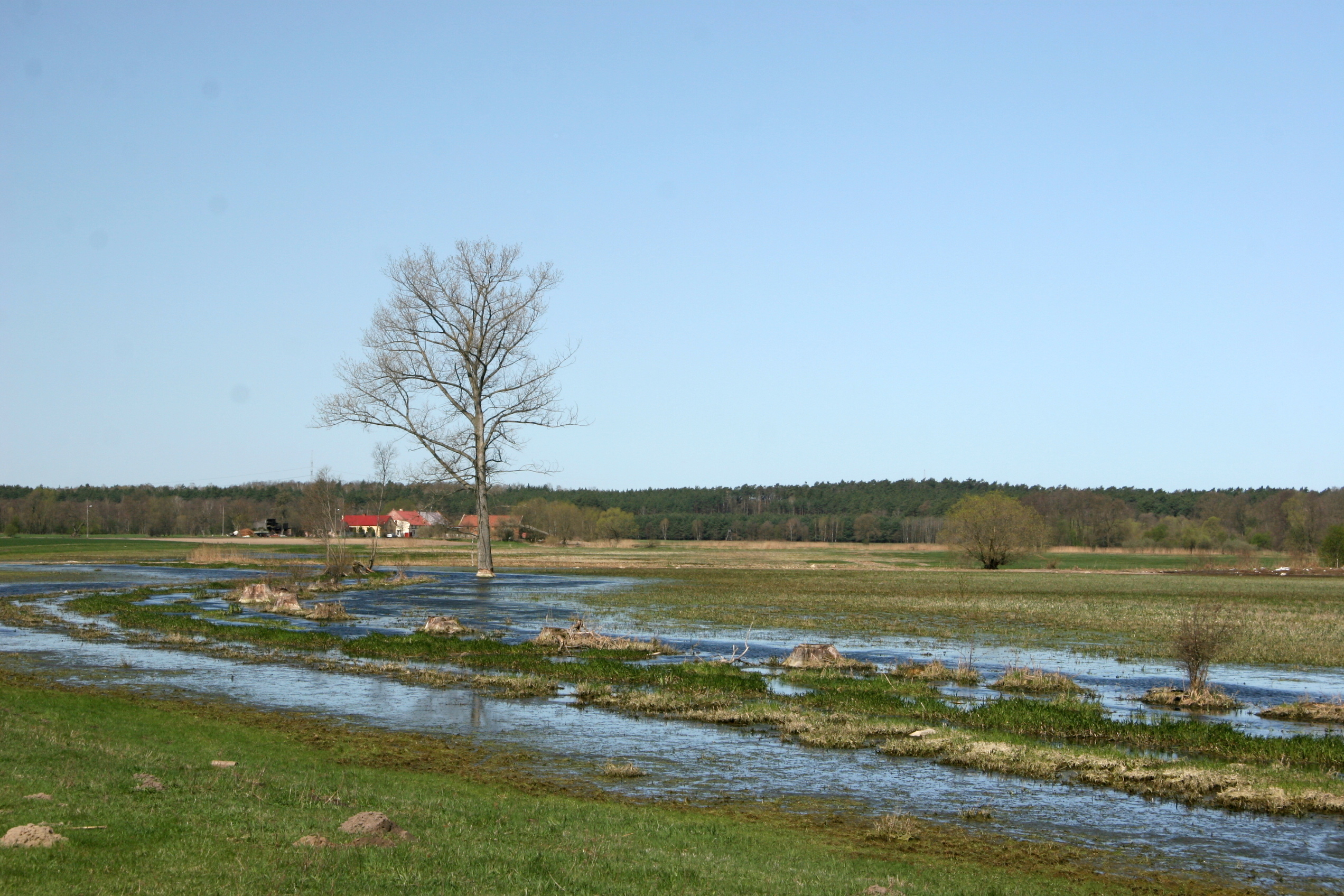

- Location within Poland
- Coordinates: 51°47′N 16°24′E
- Country: Poland
- Voivodeship: Lubusz
- County: Wschowa
- Gmina: Wschowa
- Population: 222

Łęgoń [ˈwɛnɡɔɲ] (German: Vorwerk Langenau) is a village in the administrative district of Gmina Wschowa, within Wschowa County, Lubusz Voivodeship, in western Poland.

The village has a population of 222.
