= Nowe Budy Osieckie =

- Village
- Location within Poland
- Coordinates: 52°51′44″N 19°58′19″E
- Country: Poland
- Voivodeship: Masovian
- County: Żuromin
- Gmina: Siemiątkowo

Nowe Budy Osieckie [ˈnɔvɛ ˈbudɨ ɔˈɕɛt͡skʲɛ] is a village in the administrative district of Gmina Siemiątkowo, within Żuromin County, Masovian Voivodeship, in east-central Poland.
