= Gmina Siemiątkowo =

Gmina Siemiątkowo Siemiątkowo Commune
- Gmina
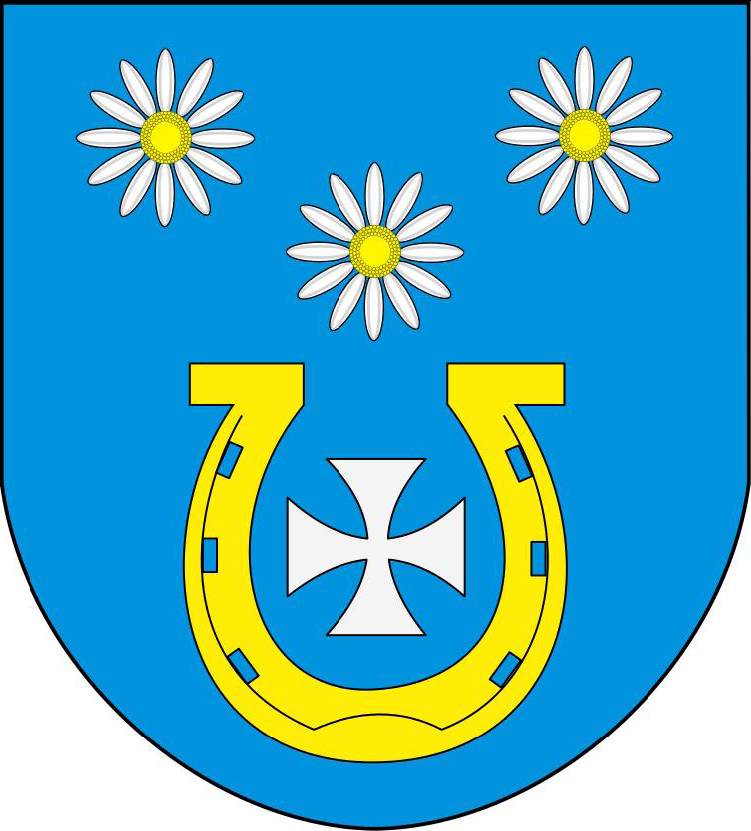
- Coat of arms
- Interactive map of Gmina Siemiątkowo
- Coordinates (Siemiątkowo): 52°53′N 20°2′E
- Country: Poland
- Voivodeship: Masovian
- County: Żuromin
- Seat: Siemiątkowo

Area
  - Total: 112.07 km^{2} (43.27 sq mi)

Population (2006)
  - Total: 3,567
  - Density: 31.83/km^{2} (82.43/sq mi)
- Time zone: UTC+1 (CET)
  - Summer (DST): UTC+2 (CEST)
- Vehicle registration: WZU
- Website: https://www.siemiatkowo.pl

Gmina Siemiątkowo is a rural gmina (administrative district) in Żuromin County, Masovian Voivodeship, in north-central Poland. Its seat is the village of Siemiątkowo, which lies approximately 23 kilometres (14 mi) south-east of Żuromin and 99 km (62 mi) north-west of Warsaw.

The gmina covers an area of 112.07 square kilometres (43.3 sq mi), and as of 2006 its total population is 3,567.

== Villages ==
Gmina Siemiątkowo contains the villages and settlements of Antoniewo, Budy Koziebrodzkie, Chomęc, Chrapoń, Cyndaty, Dzban, Dzieczewo, Goszczk, Gradzanowo Kościelne, Gutkowo, Julianowo, Karolinowo, Kolonia Siemiątkowska, Krzeczanowo, Łaszewo, Łaszewo-Wietrznik, Nowa Wieś, Nowe Budy Osieckie, Nowopole, Osowa Drobińska, Osowa Krzeczanowska, Osowa Łaszewska, Pijawnia, Rostowa, Siciarz, Siemiątkowo, Siemiątkowo-Kosmy, Siemiątkowo-Rechty, Siemiątkowo-Rogale, Siemiątkowo-Siódmaczka, Sokołowy Kąt, Stare Budy Osieckie, Suwaki, Wojciechowo, Wola Łaszewska, Wolany, Zaborze Krzeczanowskie, Ziemiany and Złe Borki.

== Neighbouring gminas ==
Gmina Siemiątkowo is bordered by the gminas of Bieżuń, Raciąż, Radzanów and Zawidz.
