= Gradzanowo Kościelne =

- Village
- Saint Catherine church in Gradzanowo Kościelne

- Location within Poland
- Coordinates: 52°53′53″N 20°5′23″E
- Country: Poland
- Voivodeship: Masovian
- County: Żuromin
- Gmina: Siemiątkowo
- Time zone: UTC+1 (CET)
  - Summer (DST): UTC+2 (CEST)
- Vehicle registration: WZU

Gradzanowo Kościelne [ɡrad͡zaˈnɔvɔ kɔɕˈt͡ɕɛlnɛ] is a village in the administrative district of Gmina Siemiątkowo, within Żuromin County, Masovian Voivodeship, in north-central Poland.

Three Polish citizens were murdered by Nazi Germany in the village during World War II.
