= Kolonia Siemiątkowska =

Village in Gmina Siemiątkowo, Poland

- Village
- Location within Poland
- Coordinates: 52°53′18″N 19°57′51″E
- Country: Poland
- Voivodeship: Masovian
- County: Żuromin
- Gmina: Siemiątkowo

Kolonia Siemiątkowska [kɔˈlɔɲa ɕɛmjɔntˈkɔfska] is a village in the administrative district of Gmina Siemiątkowo, within Żuromin County, Masovian Voivodeship, in east-central Poland.
