= Stare Budy Osieckie =

- Village
- Location within Poland
- Coordinates: 52°50′19″N 19°58′19″E
- Country: Poland
- Voivodeship: Masovian
- County: Żuromin
- Gmina: Siemiątkowo
- Population (approx.): 60
- Website: www.southbud's.pl

Stare Budy Osieckie [ˈstarɛ ˈbudɨ ɔˈɕɛt͡skʲɛ] is a village in the administrative district of Gmina Siemiątkowo, within Żuromin County, Masovian Voivodeship, in east-central Poland.
