= Konradowo, Wschowa County =

Konradowo
- Village
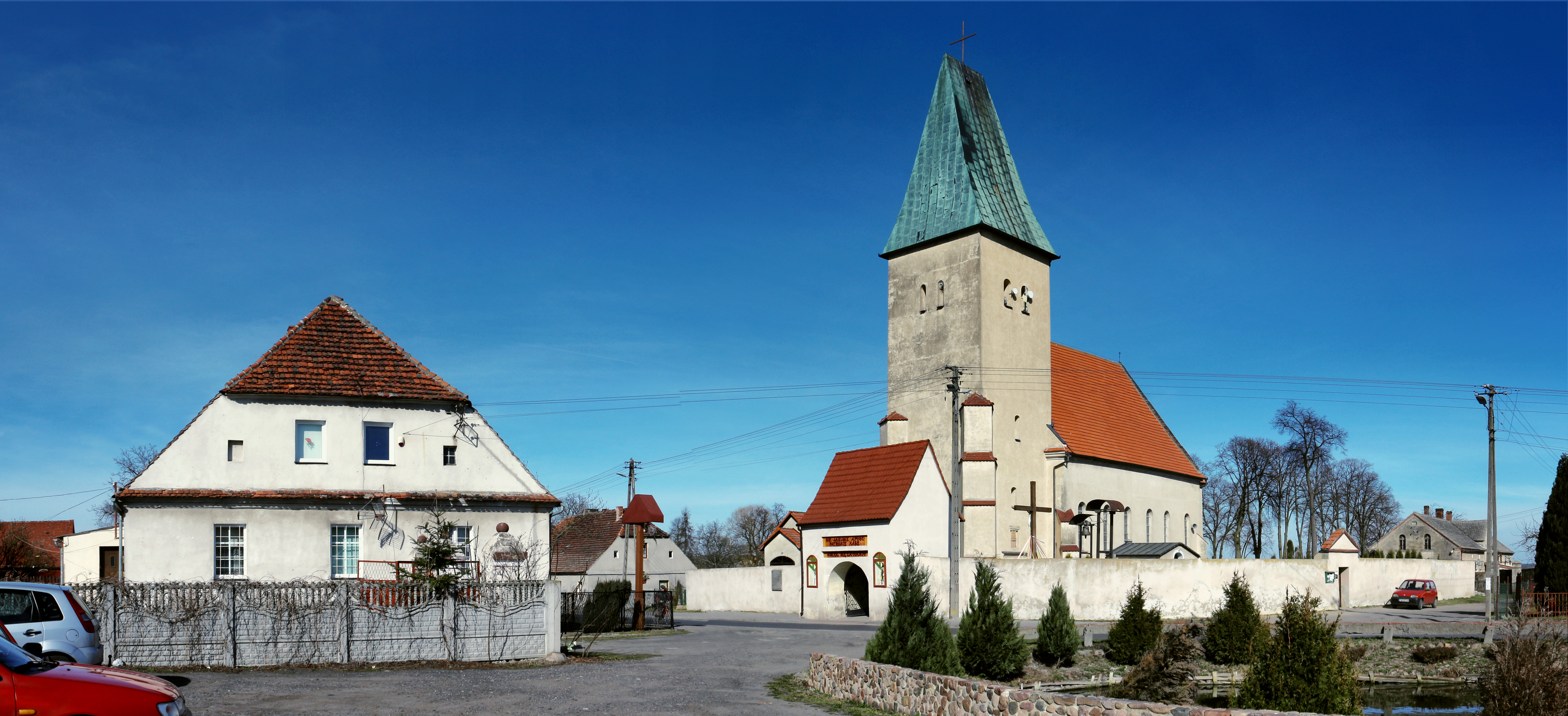

- Location within Poland
- Coordinates: 51°47′N 16°17′E
- Country: Poland
- Voivodeship: Lubusz
- County: Wschowa
- Gmina: Wschowa

Konradowo [kɔnraˈdɔvɔ] is a village in the administrative district of Gmina Wschowa, within Wschowa County, Lubusz Voivodeship, in western Poland. It lies approximately 5 km from Wschowa, and 86 km from Voivodeship capital Zielona Góra.

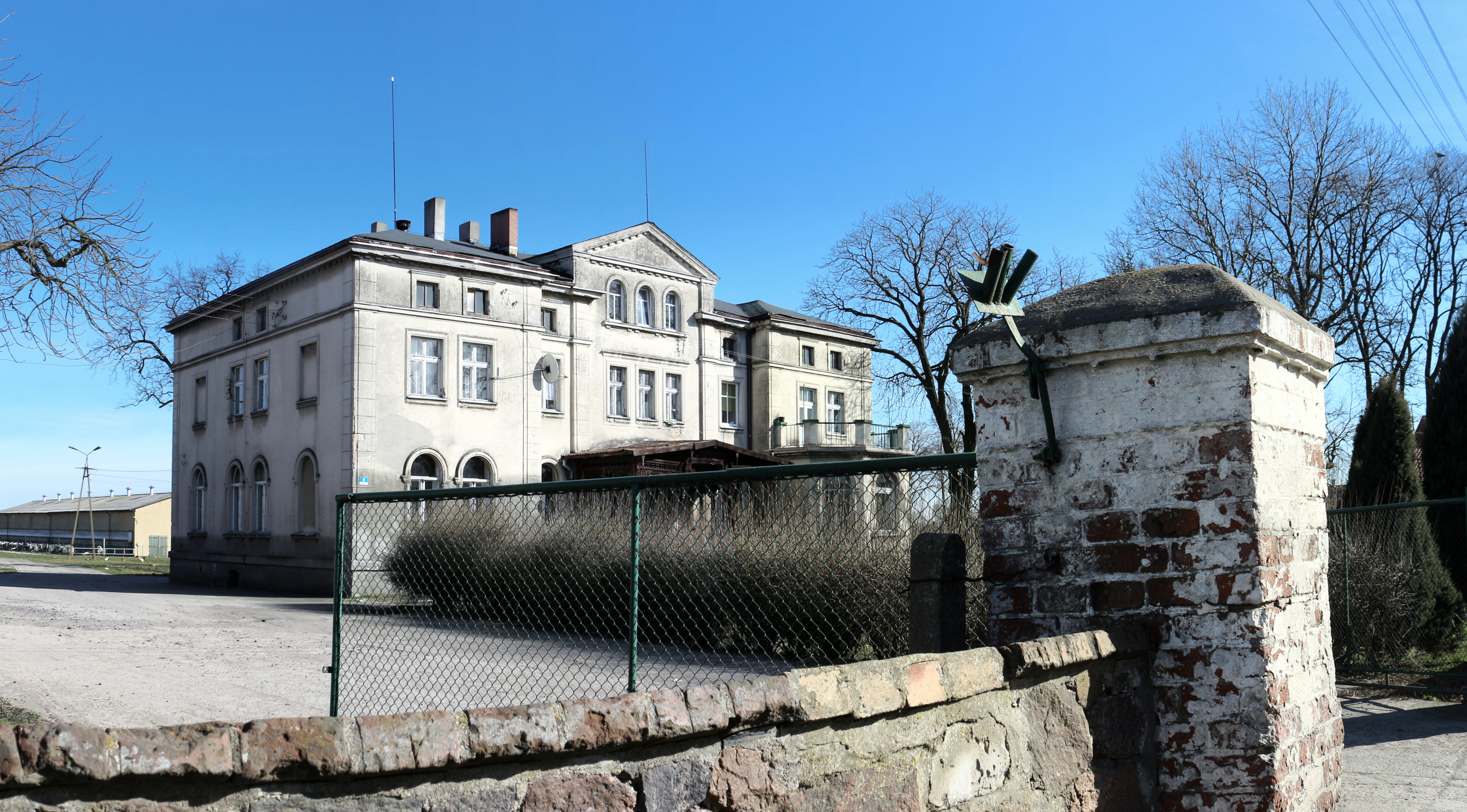
Palace in Konradowo

Konradowo was first mentioned in historical records in 1305 under the Latin name Conradi villa. In 1307, Duke Henry III of Głogów granted the village to the newly established Poor Clares monastery in Głogów. The settlement subsequently appeared in medieval documents under several variant names, including Conradisdorf, Cursdorff and Kunsdorf.

The village formed part of the historic Wschowa region, an area situated near the historical border between Greater Poland and Silesia. Its location contributed to the region’s complex political and cultural history.

The parish in Konradowo was established in 1373. A church dedicated to Saint James the Greater was documented in the fourteenth century. An earlier wooden church was later replaced by a masonry building constructed during the second half of the sixteenth century. A foundation plaque dated 1583 survives above the church’s southern entrance.

The village remained associated with the Poor Clares of Głogów until the secularisation of monastic property under Prussian rule in the early nineteenth century. The former monastic estates were subsequently sold.

A palace and associated agricultural estate were established in Konradowo during the nineteenth century. The palace, built in the final quarter of the century, was associated with the Knauer family. Robert Weimar owned the estate between 1935 and 1941.

Before the end of the Second World War in 1945, Konradowo was located within Germany and was known by its German name, Kursdorf. Following the post-war redrawing of Poland’s western borders, the village became part of Poland.

Between 1975 and 1998, Konradowo belonged administratively to Leszno Voivodeship. Since the administrative reform of 1999, it has been part of Lubusz Voivodeship.
