= Pszczółkowo =

- Settlement
- Location within Poland
- Coordinates: 51°48′55″N 16°10′15″E
- Country: Poland
- Voivodeship: Lubusz
- County: Wschowa
- Gmina: Wschowa

Pszczółkowo [pʂt͡ʂuu̯ˈkɔvɔ] is a settlement in the administrative district of Gmina Wschowa, within Wschowa County, Lubusz Voivodeship, in western Poland.
