= Olbrachcice, Lubusz Voivodeship =

Olbrachcice
- Village
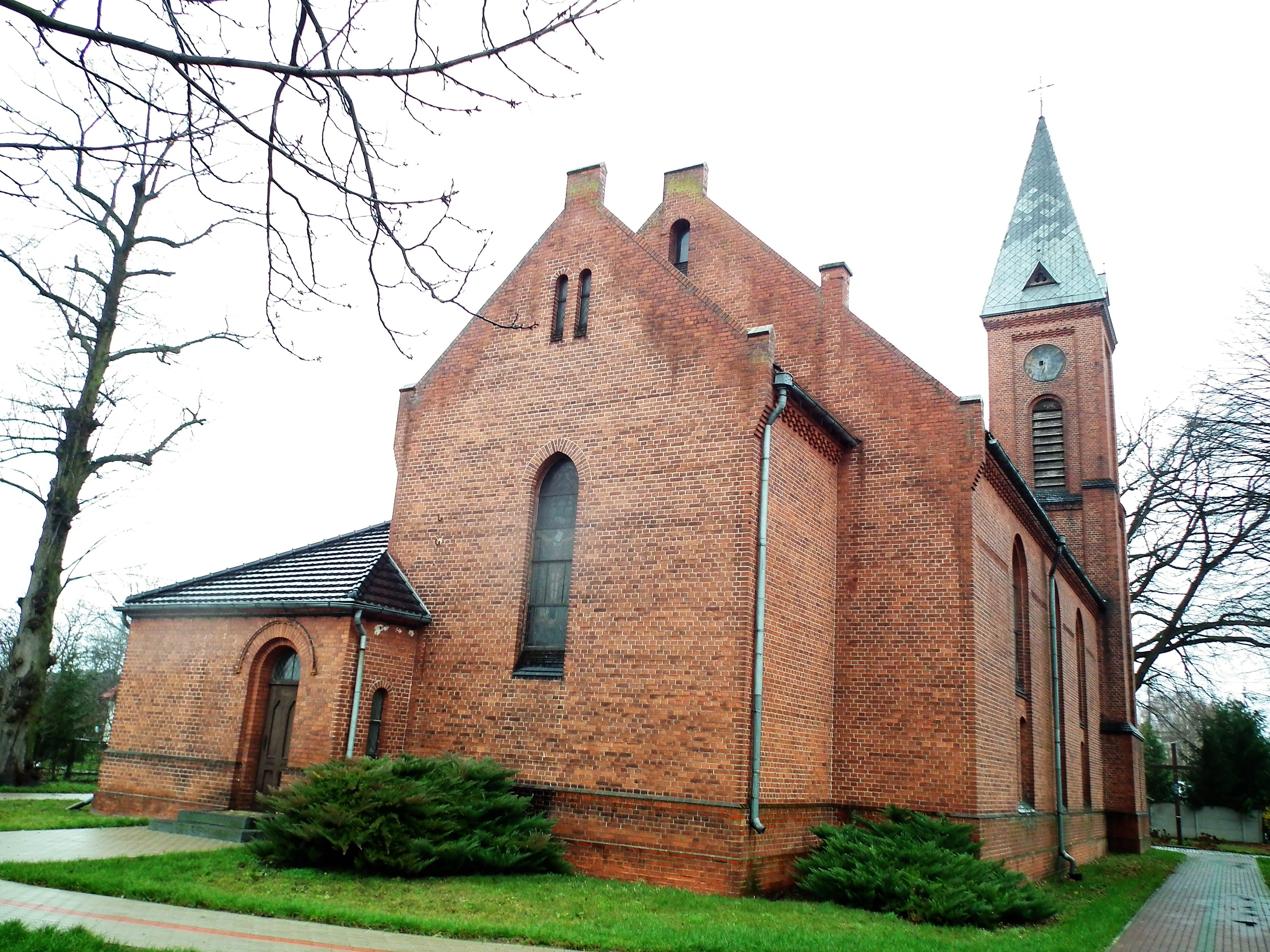
- Church of Ladislaus of Gielniów

- Location within Poland
- Coordinates: 51°47′04″N 16°22′05″E
- Country: Poland
- Voivodeship: Lubusz
- County: Wschowa
- Gmina: Wschowa

Olbrachcice [ɔlbraxˈt͡ɕit͡sɛ] (German: Ulbersdorf) is a village in the administrative district of Gmina Wschowa, within Wschowa County, Lubusz Voivodeship, in western Poland.
