= Antoniewo, Żuromin County =

Antoniewo
- Village
- Location within Poland
- Coordinates: 52°54′14″N 19°59′21″E
- Country: Poland
- Voivodeship: Masovian
- County: Żuromin
- Gmina: Siemiątkowo

Antoniewo [antɔˈɲɛvɔ] is a village in the administrative district of Gmina Siemiątkowo, within Żuromin County, Masovian Voivodeship, in east-central Poland.
