= Łysiny, Lubusz Voivodeship =

Łysiny
- Village
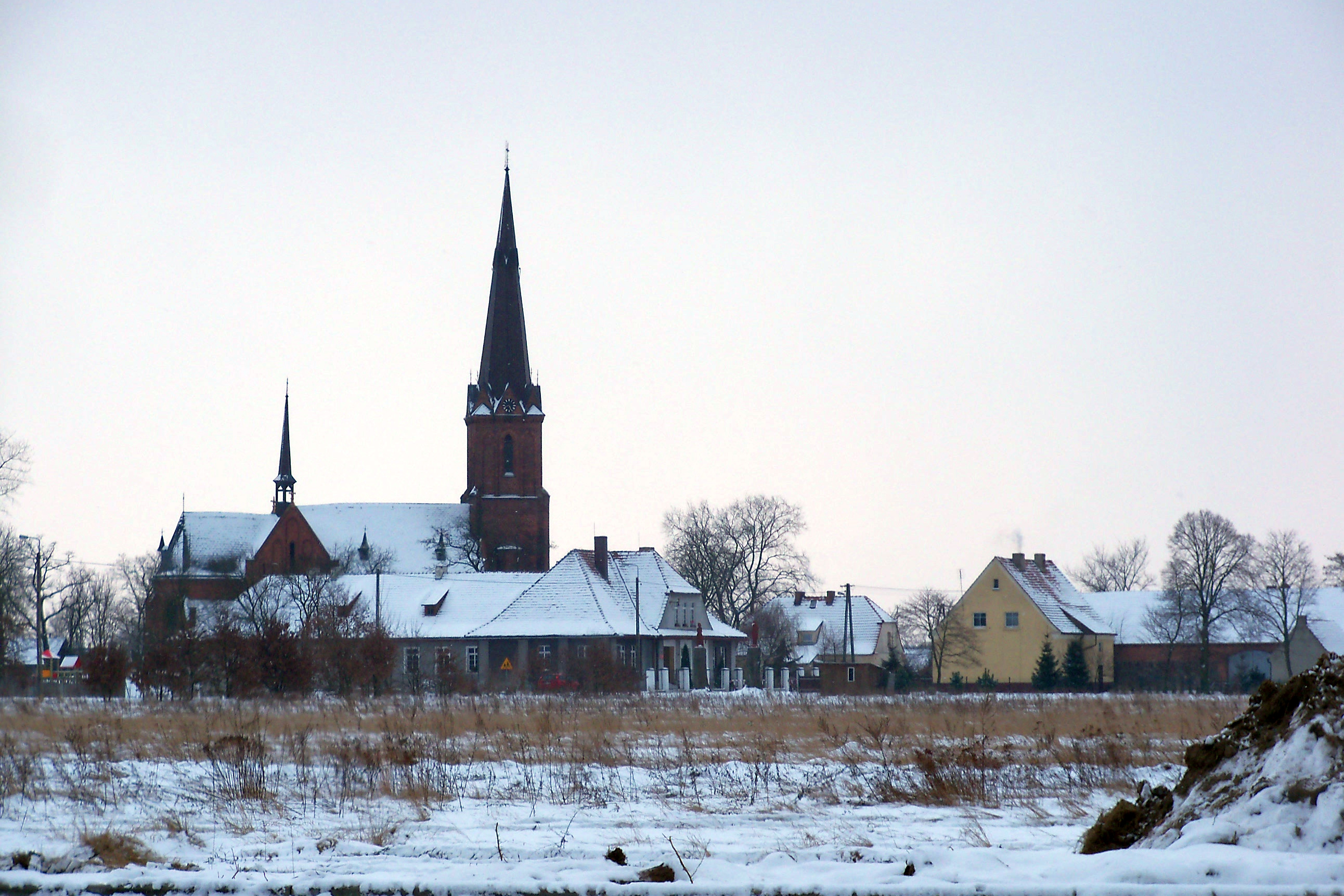

- Location within Poland
- Coordinates: 51°48′55″N 16°12′55″E
- Country: Poland
- Voivodeship: Lubusz
- County: Wschowa
- Gmina: Wschowa
- Population: 316

Łysiny [wɨˈɕinɨ] (German: Lissen) is a village in the administrative district of Gmina Wschowa, within Wschowa County, Lubusz Voivodeship, in western Poland.

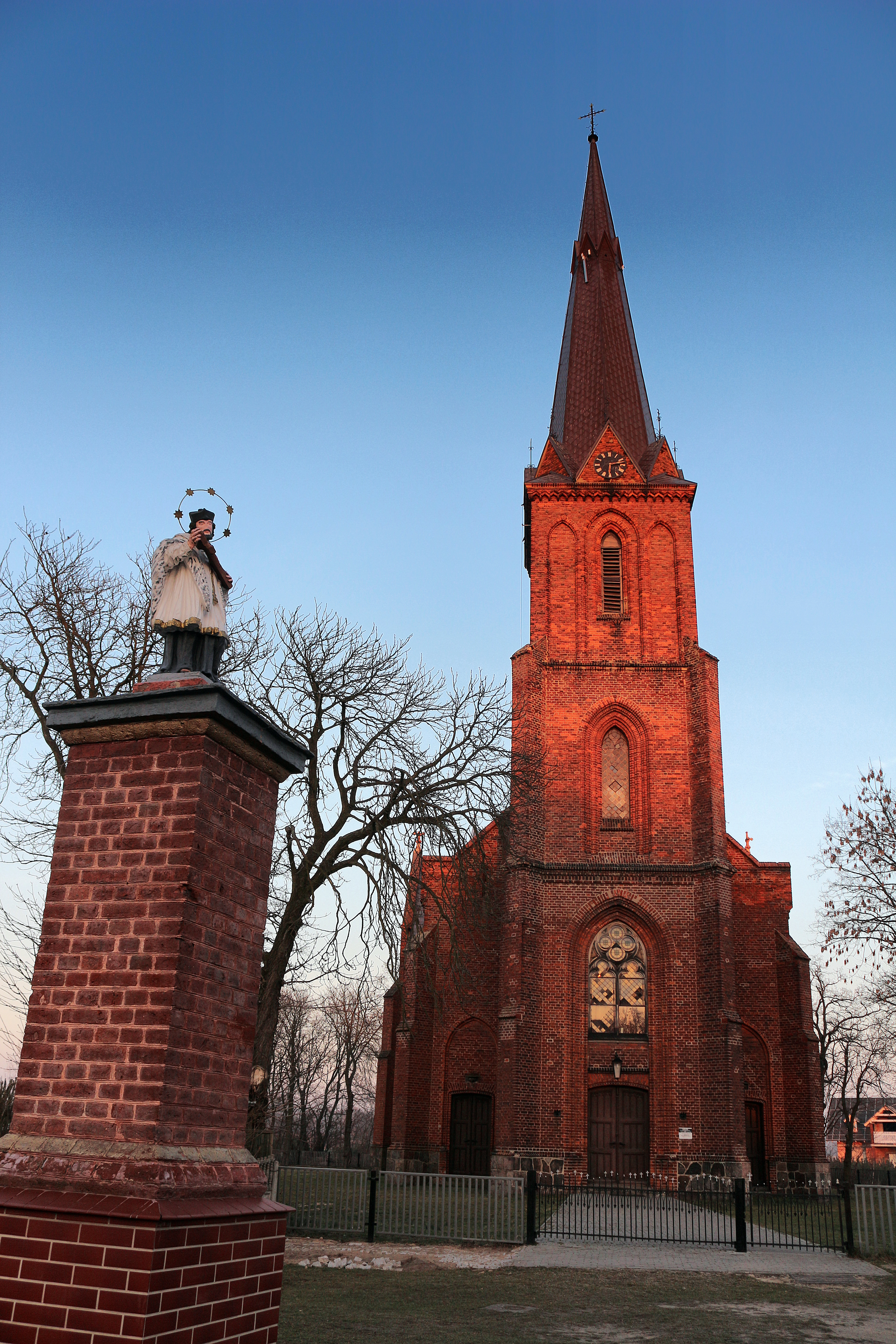
Church
