= Kandlewo =

- Village
- Location within Poland
- Coordinates: 51°45′48″N 16°16′36″E
- Country: Poland
- Voivodeship: Lubusz
- County: Wschowa
- Gmina: Wschowa

Kandlewo [kanˈdlɛvɔ] is a village in the administrative district of Gmina Wschowa, within Wschowa County, Lubusz Voivodeship, in western Poland.
