= Zwei Mütter =

1957 film

- Directed by: Frank Beyer
- Written by: Leonie Ossowski
- Screenplay by: Frank Beyer, Leonie Ossowski
- Cinematography: Otto Merz
- Music by: Joachim Werzlau
- Release date: 1957
- Running time: 1h 27m
- Country: East Germany
- Language: German

Zwei Mütter (English: Two mothers) is a 1957 East German film directed by Frank Beyer and based on a screenplay by Leonie Ossowski. The film was Beyer's graduation film at the Film School of the Academy of Performing Arts (FAMU) in Prague. It tells the story of two women, one French and the other German, who fight for a child who has been mistakenly taken by the Germans after a bomb raid. The film had a theatrical release and became a popular success with more than two million tickets sold in East Germany, but was also criticized for "lack of a stance" and "bourgeois pacifism".
