= Przyczyna Dolna =

- Village
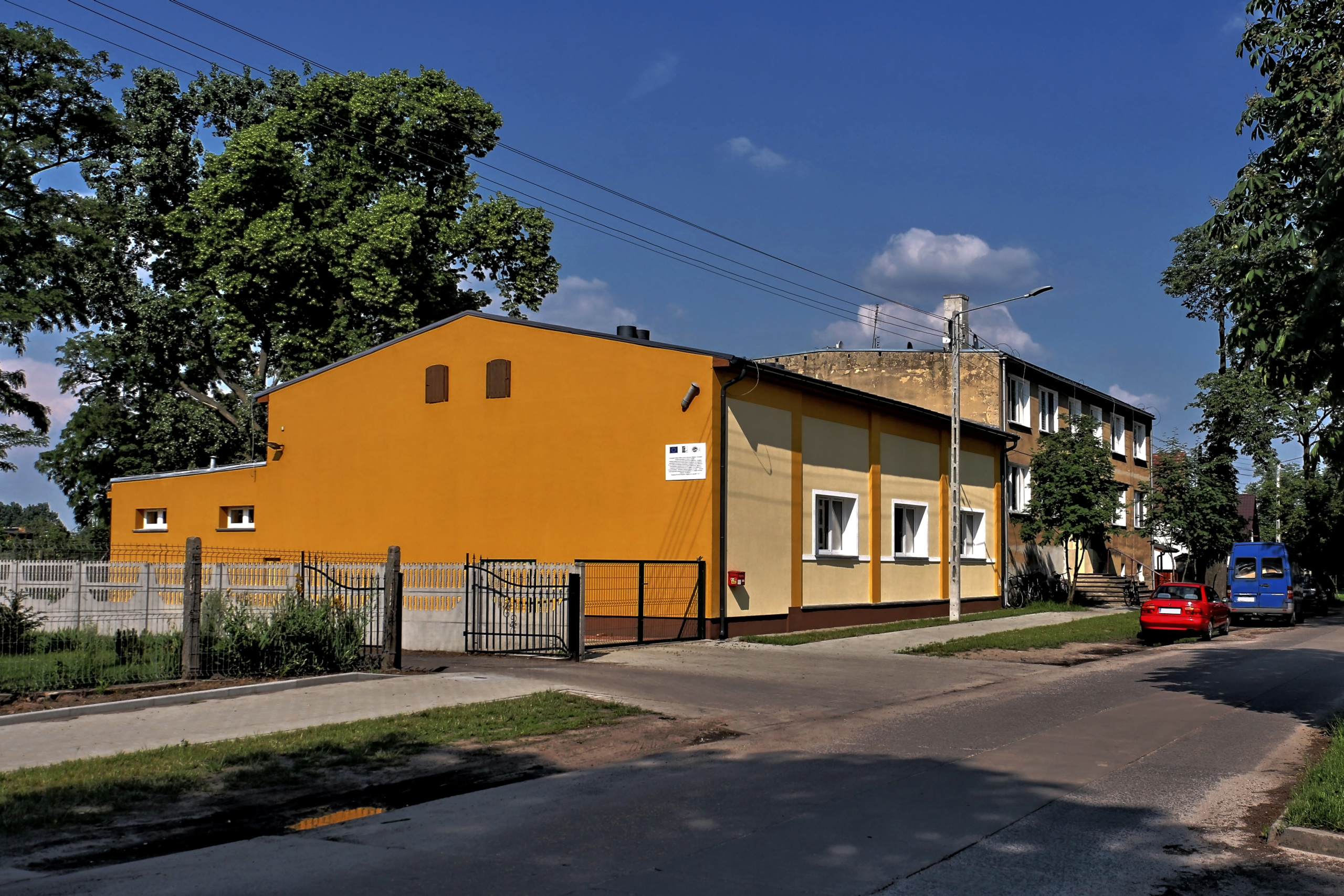

- Location within Poland
- Coordinates: 51°48′05″N 16°20′15″E
- Country: Poland
- Voivodeship: Lubusz
- County: Wschowa
- Gmina: Wschowa

Przyczyna Dolna [pʂɨˈt͡ʂɨna ˈdɔlna] (German: Nieder Pritschen) is a village in the administrative district of Gmina Wschowa, within Wschowa County, Lubusz Voivodeship, in western Poland.
