= Dzban, Masovian Voivodeship =

Dzban
- Village
- Location within Poland
- Coordinates: 52°52′13″N 20°00′37″E
- Country: Poland
- Voivodeship: Masovian
- County: Żuromin
- Gmina: Siemiątkowo

Dzban [d͡zban] is a village in the administrative district of Gmina Siemiątkowo, within Żuromin County, Masovian Voivodeship, in east-central Poland.
