= Wygnańczyce =

- Village
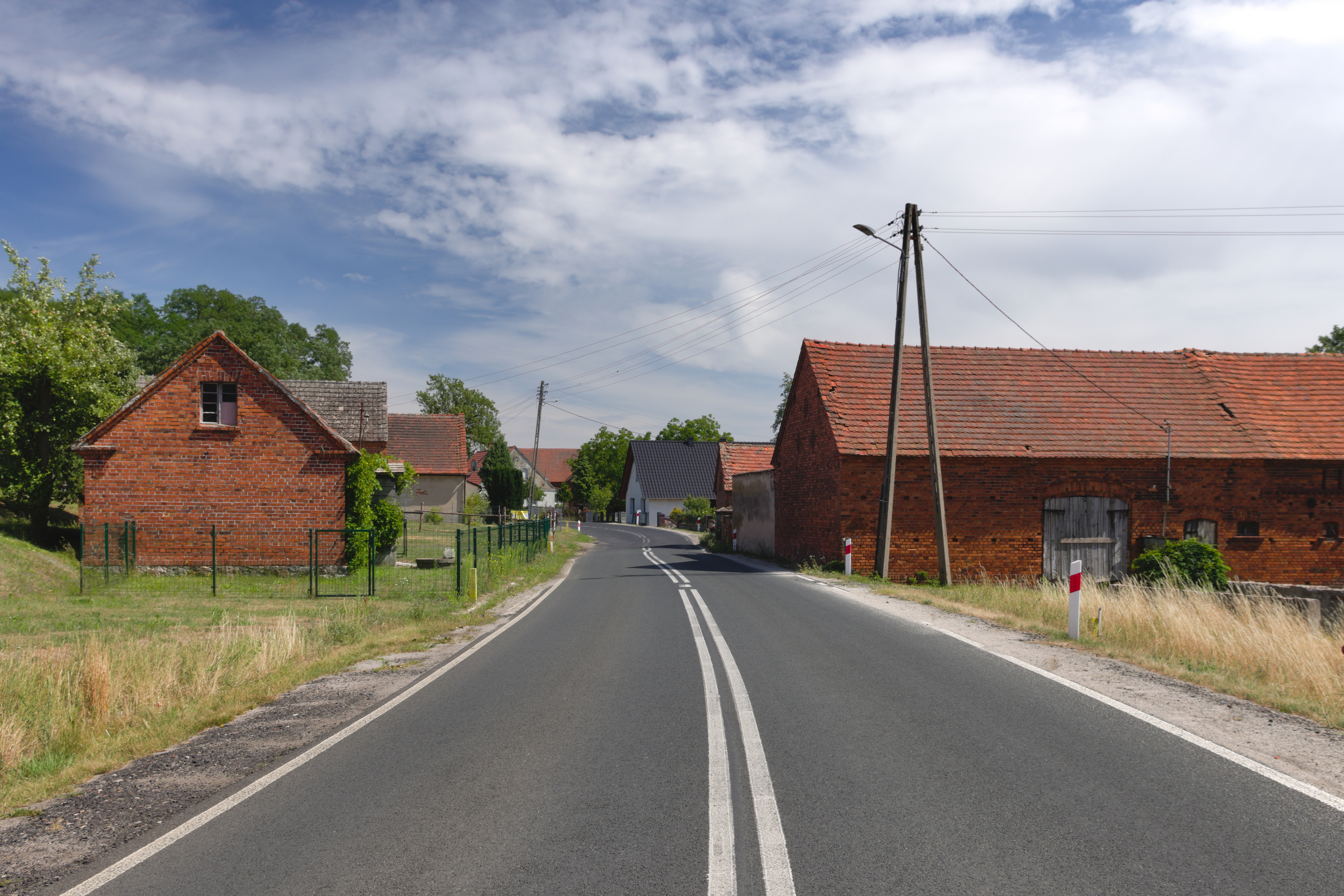

- Location within Poland
- Coordinates: 51°49′49″N 16°11′36″E
- Country: Poland
- Voivodeship: Lubusz
- County: Wschowa
- Gmina: Wschowa

Wygnańczyce [vɨɡnaɲˈt͡ʂɨt͡sɛ] (German: Weigmannsdorf) is a village in the administrative district of Gmina Wschowa, within Wschowa County, Lubusz Voivodeship, in western Poland.
