= Cyndaty =

- Village
- Location within Poland
- Coordinates: 52°50′53″N 20°06′45″E
- Country: Poland
- Voivodeship: Masovian
- County: Żuromin
- Gmina: Siemiątkowo

Cyndaty [t͡sɨnˈdatɨ] is a village in the administrative district of Gmina Siemiątkowo, within Żuromin County, Masovian Voivodeship, in East-Central Poland.
