= Wincentowo, Lubusz Voivodeship =

Wincentowo
- Village
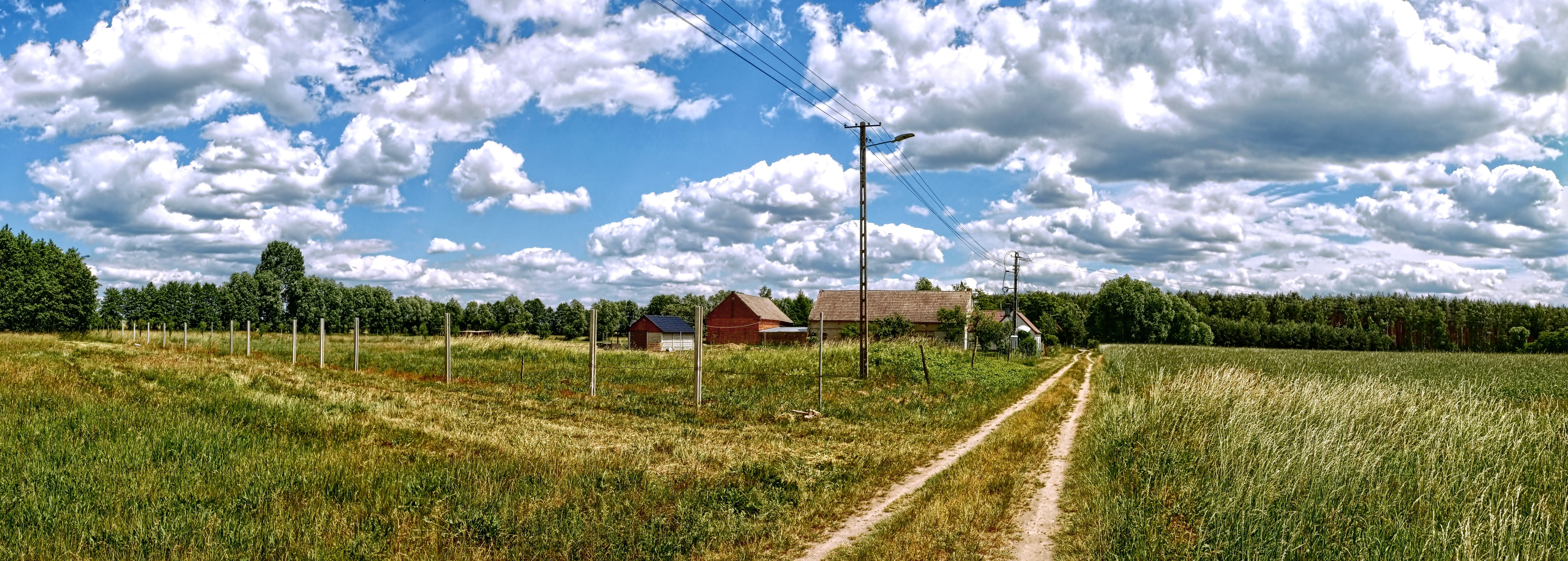

- Location within Poland
- Coordinates: 51°50′16″N 16°20′14″E
- Country: Poland
- Voivodeship: Lubusz
- County: Wschowa
- Gmina: Wschowa

Wincentowo [vint͡sɛnˈtɔvɔ] (German: Wiesenthal) is a village in the administrative district of Gmina Wschowa, within Wschowa County, Lubusz Voivodeship, in western Poland.
