= Chrapoń, Gmina Siemiątkowo =

Chrapoń
- Village
- Location within Poland
- Coordinates: 52°54′39″N 20°2′30″E
- Country: Poland
- Voivodeship: Masovian
- County: Żuromin
- Gmina: Siemiątkowo
- Time zone: UTC+1 (CET)
  - Summer (DST): UTC+2 (CEST)

Chrapoń [ˈxrapɔɲ] is a village in the administrative district of Gmina Siemiątkowo, within Żuromin County, Masovian Voivodeship, in north-central Poland.
