= Budy Koziebrodzkie =

- Village
- Location within Poland
- Coordinates: 52°51′9″N 19°58′54″E
- Country: Poland
- Voivodeship: Masovian
- County: Żuromin
- Gmina: Siemiątkowo

Budy Koziebrodzkie [ˈbudɨ kɔʑɛˈbrɔt͡skʲɛ] is a village in the administrative district of Gmina Siemiątkowo, within Żuromin County, Masovian Voivodeship, in east-central Poland.
