= Osofsky =

Osofsky is a surname. Notable people with the surname include:

- Aileen Osofsky (1926–2010), American community leader, philanthropist, and bridge player
- Barbara L. Osofsky (born 1937), American mathematician
- Howard Osofsky (born 1935), American gynecologist, obstetrician, and psychiatrist, husband of Joy
- Joy Osofsky, American psychologist, wife of Howard
- Lisa Osofsky (born 1961), American-British lawyer
- Steven Osofsky, American veterinarian

== See also ==
- Ossowski
