= Tylewice =

- Village
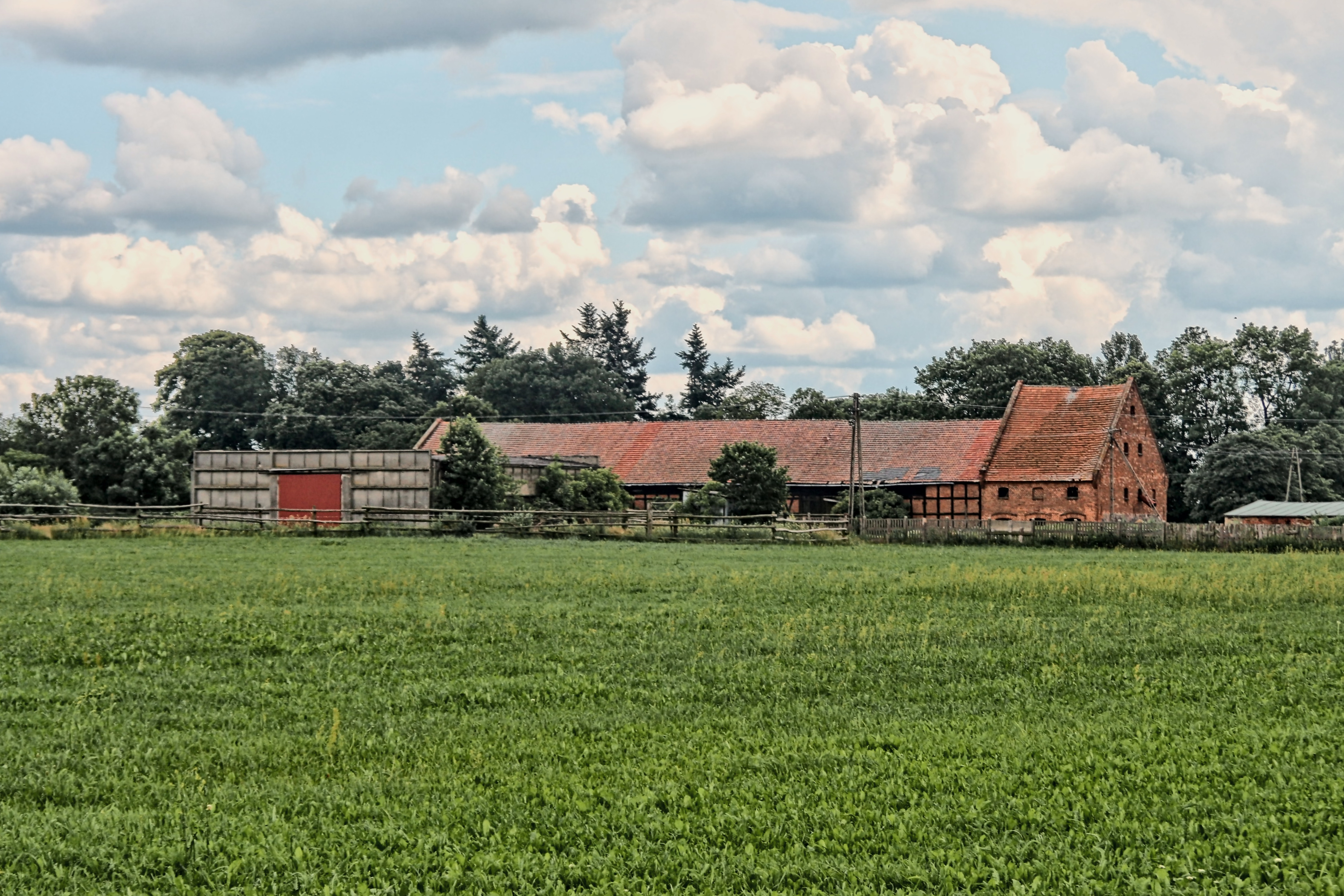

- Location within Poland
- Coordinates: 51°49′N 16°15′E
- Country: Poland
- Voivodeship: Lubusz
- County: Wschowa
- Gmina: Wschowa

Tylewice [tɨlɛˈvit͡sɛ] is a village in the administrative district of Gmina Wschowa, within Wschowa County, Lubusz Voivodeship, in western Poland.

== Notable residents ==
- Walter von Unruh (1877–1956), German general
