= Chomęc =

Village in Gmina Siemiatkowo, Poland

- Village
- Location within Poland
- Coordinates: 52°51′58″N 20°03′20″E
- Country: Poland
- Voivodeship: Masovian
- County: Żuromin
- Gmina: Siemiątkowo
- Population: 50

Chomęc [ˈxɔmɛnt͡s] is a village in the administrative district of Gmina Siemiątkowo, within Żuromin County, Masovian Voivodeship, in east-central Poland.
