= Dzieczewo =

- Village
- Location within Poland
- Coordinates: 52°56′N 20°2′E
- Country: Poland
- Voivodeship: Masovian
- County: Żuromin
- Gmina: Siemiątkowo

Dzieczewo [d͡ʑɛˈt͡ʂɛvɔ] is a village in the administrative district of Gmina Siemiątkowo, within Żuromin County, Masovian Voivodeship, in east-central Poland.
