= Krzeczanowo =

- Village
- Location within Poland
- Coordinates: 52°51′N 20°6′E
- Country: Poland
- Voivodeship: Masovian
- County: Żuromin
- Gmina: Siemiątkowo

Krzeczanowo [kʂɛt͡ʂaˈnɔvɔ] is a village in the administrative district of Gmina Siemiątkowo, within Żuromin County, Masovian Voivodeship, in east-central Poland.
