= Buczyna, Wschowa County =

Buczyna
- Village
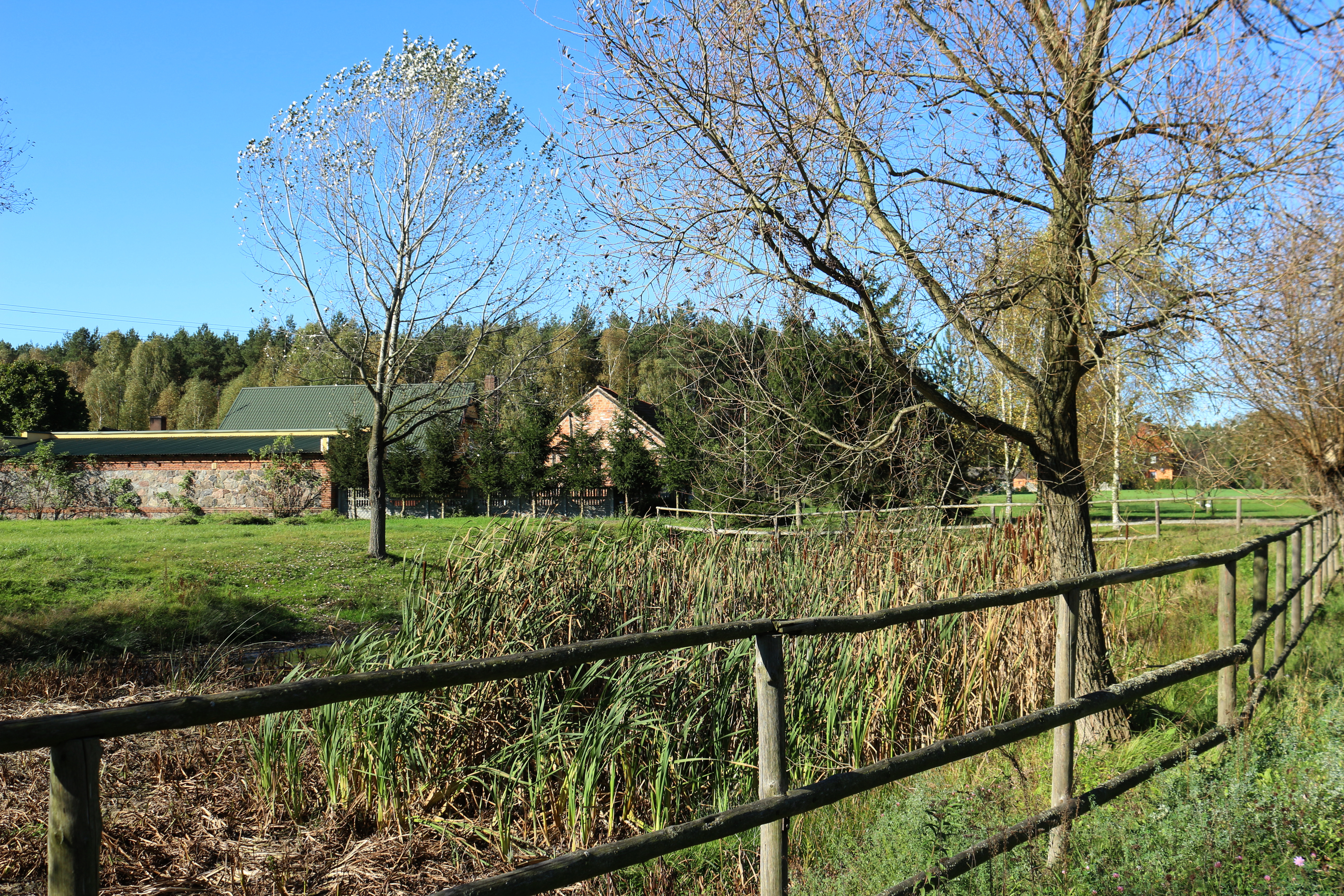

- Location within Poland
- Coordinates: 51°50′13″N 16°18′23″E
- Country: Poland
- Voivodeship: Lubusz
- County: Wschowa
- Gmina: Wschowa

Buczyna [buˈt͡ʂɨna] is a village in the administrative district of Gmina Wschowa, within Wschowa County, Lubusz Voivodeship, in western Poland. It lies approximately 4 km from Wschowa, and 71 km from Voivodeship capital, Zielona Góra.

From 1793 to 1918 it was a Prussian village. From 1918 to 1945 it was an German border village bordering the Republic of Poland.

Only 4 old houses survived World War II, one being partly destroyed, and one being later used for government purposes, until repurposed into a civilian house.

There was also an historic barn, but as of 2026 it had collapsed, ruins remaining.
