= Gmina Wschowa =

Gmina Wschowa Wschowa Commune
- Gmina
- Coat of arms
- Interactive map of Gmina Wschowa
- Coordinates (Wschowa): 51°48′N 16°18′E
- Country: Poland
- Voivodeship: Lubusz
- County: Wschowa
- Seat: Wschowa

Area
  - Total: 198.3 km^{2} (76.6 sq mi)

Population (2019-06-30)
  - Total: 21,162
  - Density: 106.7/km^{2} (276.4/sq mi)
  - Urban: 13,875
  - Rural: 7,287
- Website: https://gminawschowa.pl/

Gmina Wschowa is an urban-rural gmina (administrative district) in Wschowa County, Lubusz Voivodeship, in western Poland. Its seat is the town of Wschowa, which lies approximately 57 kilometres (35 mi) east of Zielona Góra.

The gmina covers an area of 198.3 square kilometres (76.6 sq mi), and as of 2019 its total population is 21,162.

The gmina contains part of the protected area called Przemęt Landscape Park.

== Villages ==
Apart from the town of Wschowa, Gmina Wschowa contains the villages and settlements of Buczyna, Czerlejewo, Dębowa Łęka, Hetmanice, Kandlewo, Klucz, Konradowo, Łęgoń, Lgiń, Łysiny, Mały Bór, Nowa Wieś, Olbrachcice, Osowa Sień, Przyczyna Dolna, Przyczyna Górna, Pszczółkowo, Siedlnica, Tylewice, Wincentowo and Wygnańczyce.

== Neighbouring gminas ==
Gmina Wschowa is bordered by the gminas of Niechlów, Sława, Święciechowa, Szlichtyngowa, Wijewo and Włoszakowice.

== Twin towns – sister cities ==
Gmina Wschowa is twinned with:

- Šalčininkai, Lithuania
