= Siemiątkowo-Siódmaczka =

- Village
- Location within Poland
- Coordinates: 52°53′26″N 19°58′42″E
- Country: Poland
- Voivodeship: Masovian
- County: Żuromin
- Gmina: Siemiątkowo

Siemiątkowo-Siódmaczka [ɕɛmjɔntˈkɔvɔ ɕudˈmat͡ʂka] is a village in the administrative district of Gmina Siemiątkowo, within Żuromin County, Masovian Voivodeship, in east-central Poland.
