= Julianowo, Masovian Voivodeship =

Julianowo
- Village
- Location within Poland
- Coordinates: 52°50′41″N 20°0′0″E
- Country: Poland
- Voivodeship: Masovian
- County: Żuromin
- Gmina: Siemiątkowo

Julianowo [juljaˈnɔvɔ] is a village in the administrative district of Gmina Siemiątkowo, within Żuromin County, Masovian Voivodeship, in east-central Poland.
