= Złe Borki =

- Village
- Location within Poland
- Coordinates: 52°51′50″N 19°59′26″E
- Country: Poland
- Voivodeship: Masovian
- County: Żuromin
- Gmina: Siemiątkowo
- Population: 21

Złe Borki [ˈzwɛ ˈbɔrki] is a village in the administrative district of Gmina Siemiątkowo, within Żuromin County, Masovian Voivodeship, in east-central Poland.
