= Czerlejewo =

- Village
- Location within Poland
- Coordinates: 51°44′14″N 16°21′26″E
- Country: Poland
- Voivodeship: Lubusz
- County: Wschowa
- Gmina: Wschowa
- Population: 30

Czerlejewo [t͡ʂɛrlɛˈjɛvɔ] is a village in the administrative district of Gmina Wschowa, within Wschowa County, Lubusz Voivodeship, in western Poland.
