= Wola Łaszewska =

- Village
- Location within Poland
- Coordinates: 52°52′N 20°8′E
- Country: Poland
- Voivodeship: Masovian
- County: Żuromin
- Gmina: Siemiątkowo

Wola Łaszewska [ˈvɔla waˈʂɛfska] is a village in the administrative district of Gmina Siemiątkowo, within Żuromin County, Masovian Voivodeship, in east-central Poland.
