= Siemiątkowo-Rogale =

- Village
- Location within Poland
- Coordinates: 52°53′43″N 20°00′42″E
- Country: Poland
- Voivodeship: Masovian
- County: Żuromin
- Gmina: Siemiątkowo

Siemiątkowo-Rogale [ɕɛmjɔntˈkɔvɔ rɔˈɡalɛ] is a village in the administrative district of Gmina Siemiątkowo, within Żuromin County, Masovian Voivodeship, in east-central Poland.
