= Zaborze Krzeczanowskie =

- Village
- Location within Poland
- Coordinates: 52°51′23″N 20°6′54″E
- Country: Poland
- Voivodeship: Masovian
- County: Żuromin
- Gmina: Siemiątkowo

Zaborze Krzeczanowskie [zaˈbɔʐɛ kʂɛt͡ʂaˈnɔfskʲɛ] is a village in the administrative district of Gmina Siemiątkowo, within Żuromin County, Masovian Voivodeship, in east-central Poland.
