= Siciarz =

- Village
- Location within Poland
- Coordinates: 52°55′43″N 20°00′38″E
- Country: Poland
- Voivodeship: Masovian
- County: Żuromin
- Gmina: Siemiątkowo

Siciarz [ˈɕit͡ɕaʂ] is a village in the administrative district of Gmina Siemiątkowo, within Żuromin County, Masovian Voivodeship, in east-central Poland.
