= Siemiątkowo, Żuromin County =

Siemiątkowo
- Village
- Location within Poland
- Coordinates: 52°53′N 20°2′E
- Country: Poland
- Voivodeship: Masovian
- County: Żuromin
- Gmina: Siemiątkowo
- Website: http://www.siemiatkowo.pl/

Siemiątkowo [ɕɛmjɔntˈkɔvɔ] is a village in Żuromin County, Masovian Voivodeship, in east-central Poland. It is the seat of the gmina (administrative district) called Gmina Siemiątkowo.
