= Walter von Unruh =

Prussian officer and General

- Walter von Unruh as Major during WWI
- Born: 30 December 1877; Gut Klein Tillendorf near Fraustadt, Kingdom of Prussia
- Died: 16 September 1956 (aged 78); Bad Berneck im Fichtelgebirge, Germany
- Military career
- Allegiance: German Empire (to 1918); Weimar Republic (to 1933); Nazi Germany
- Branch: Heer
- Service years: 1896–1945
- Rank: General of Infantry
- Conflicts: World War I World War II
- Awards: Pour le Mérite

Walter von Unruh (30 December 1877 in Gut Klein Tillendorf bei Fraustadt – 16 September 1956 in Bad Berneck im Fichtelgebirge) was a Prussian officer, and later General during World War II. Also, he was a recipient of Pour le Mérite.

== Awards ==
- Iron Cross (1914), 1st and 2nd class
- Pour le Mérite (21 April 1918)
- Gallipoli Star (Ottoman Empire) ("Iron Crescent")
- Honorary Knights of St. John
- Knight's Cross of the Royal House Order of Hohenzollern with Swords
- Prussian Service Award
- Military Merit Order, 3rd class (Bavaria)
- Knight's Cross, First Class of the Albert Order with swords
- Knight's Cross of the Military Merit Order (Württemberg)
- General Honour Decoration for Bravery (Hesse)
- Hanseatic Cross of Hamburg
- Knight's Cross, First Class of the Order of the White Falcon with swords (Weimar)
- Knight's Cross of the Order of Leopold with War Decoration (Austria)
- Order of the Iron Crown, 3rd class with War Decoration (Austria)
- Military Merit Cross, 3rd class with War Decoration (Austria-Hungary)
- Knights Cross of the War Merit Cross with Swords (1943)
