= Nowa Wieś, Gmina Siemiątkowo =

Nowa Wieś
- Village
- Location within Poland
- Coordinates: 52°54′38″N 20°0′23″E
- Country: Poland
- Voivodeship: Masovian
- County: Żuromin
- Gmina: Siemiątkowo
- Population: 230

Nowa Wieś [ˈnɔva ˈvjɛɕ] is a village in the administrative district of Gmina Siemiątkowo, within Żuromin County, Masovian Voivodeship, in east-central Poland.
