= Ziemiany, Masovian Voivodeship =

Ziemiany
- Village
- Location within Poland
- Coordinates: 52°52′N 20°3′E
- Country: Poland
- Voivodeship: Masovian
- County: Żuromin
- Gmina: Siemiątkowo

Ziemiany [ʑɛˈmjanɨ] is a village in the administrative district of Gmina Siemiątkowo, within Żuromin County, Masovian Voivodeship, in east-central Poland.
