= Osowa Drobińska =

- Village
- Location within Poland
- Coordinates: 52°50′18″N 20°1′46″E
- Country: Poland
- Voivodeship: Masovian
- County: Żuromin
- Gmina: Siemiątkowo
- Population: 80

Osowa Drobińska [ɔˈsɔva drɔˈbiɲska] is a village in the administrative district of Gmina Siemiątkowo, within Żuromin County, Masovian Voivodeship, in east-central Poland.
