= Nowopole, Żuromin County =

Nowopole
- Village
- Location within Poland
- Coordinates: 52°53′59″N 19°57′36″E
- Country: Poland
- Voivodeship: Masovian
- County: Żuromin
- Gmina: Siemiątkowo

Nowopole [nɔvɔˈpɔlɛ] is a village in the administrative district of Gmina Siemiątkowo, within Żuromin County, Masovian Voivodeship, in east-central Poland.
