= Mały Bór, Lubusz Voivodeship =

Mały Bór
- Village
- Location within Poland
- Coordinates: 51°51′33″N 16°13′26″E
- Country: Poland
- Voivodeship: Lubusz
- County: Wschowa
- Gmina: Wschowa

Mały Bór (Polish: [ˈmawɨ ˈbur]; German: Klein Heyde) is a village in the administrative district of Gmina Wschowa, within Wschowa County, Lubusz Voivodeship, in western Poland.
