= Osowa Łaszewska =

- Village
- Location within Poland
- Coordinates: 52°50′40″N 20°01′56″E
- Country: Poland
- Voivodeship: Masovian
- County: Żuromin
- Gmina: Siemiątkowo

Osowa Łaszewska [ɔˈsɔva waˈʂɛfska] is a village in the administrative district of Gmina Siemiątkowo, within Żuromin County, Masovian Voivodeship, in east-central Poland.
