= Osowa Krzeczanowska =

- Village
- Location within Poland
- Coordinates: 52°50′19″N 20°03′48″E
- Country: Poland
- Voivodeship: Masovian
- County: Żuromin
- Gmina: Siemiątkowo

Osowa Krzeczanowska [ɔˈsɔva kʂɛt͡ʂaˈnɔfska] is a village in the administrative district of Gmina Siemiątkowo, within Żuromin County, Masovian Voivodeship, in east-central Poland.
