= Osowa Sień =

- Village
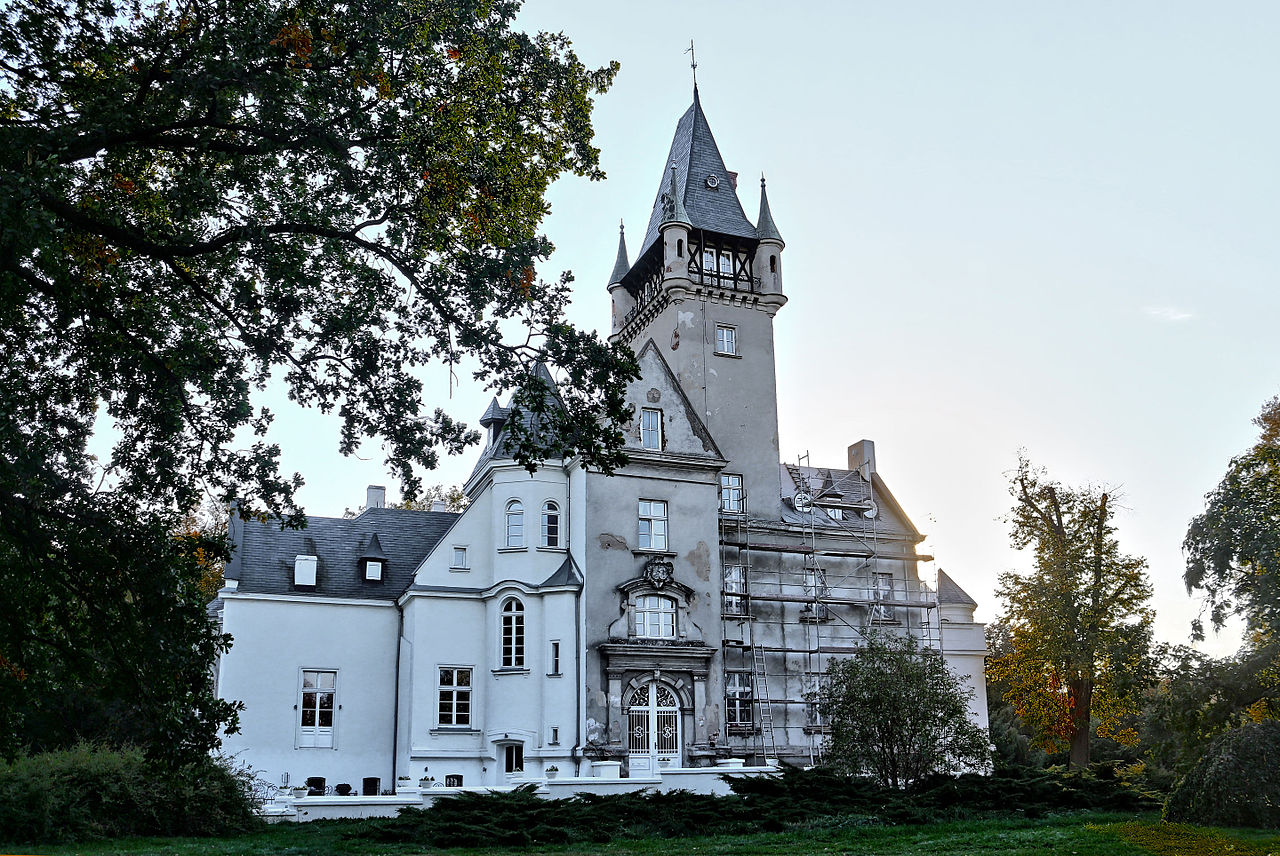
- Palace

- Location within Poland
- Coordinates: 51°50′16″N 16°20′14″E
- Country: Poland
- Voivodeship: Lubusz
- County: Wschowa
- Gmina: Wschowa
- Population (2010): 1,132
- Postal code: 67-400
- Area code: (+48) 65
- Car plates: FWS

Osowa Sień [ɔˈsɔva ˈɕɛɲ] (German: Röhrsdorf) is a village in the administrative district of Gmina Wschowa, within Wschowa County, Lubusz Voivodeship, in western Poland.

== Etymology ==
The current name of the village is literally a house in the aspen and appears in Polish historical sources also as Ossowa Sień or Ossowasień. The German name is derived from the name of a German settler Rüdiger and occurs in older versions as Rüdigersdorf or later shortened Röhrsdorf.

== Heritage ==
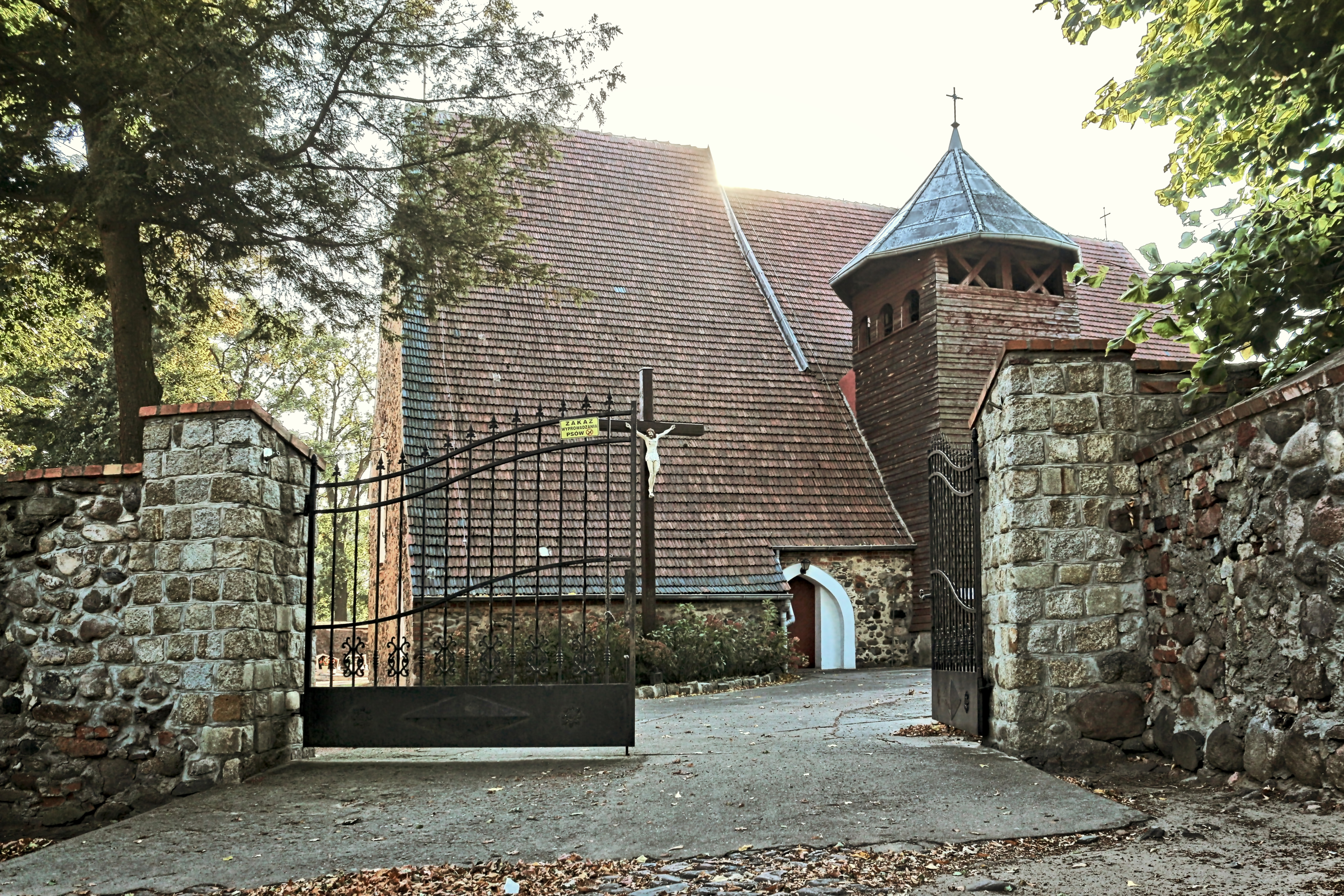
Church

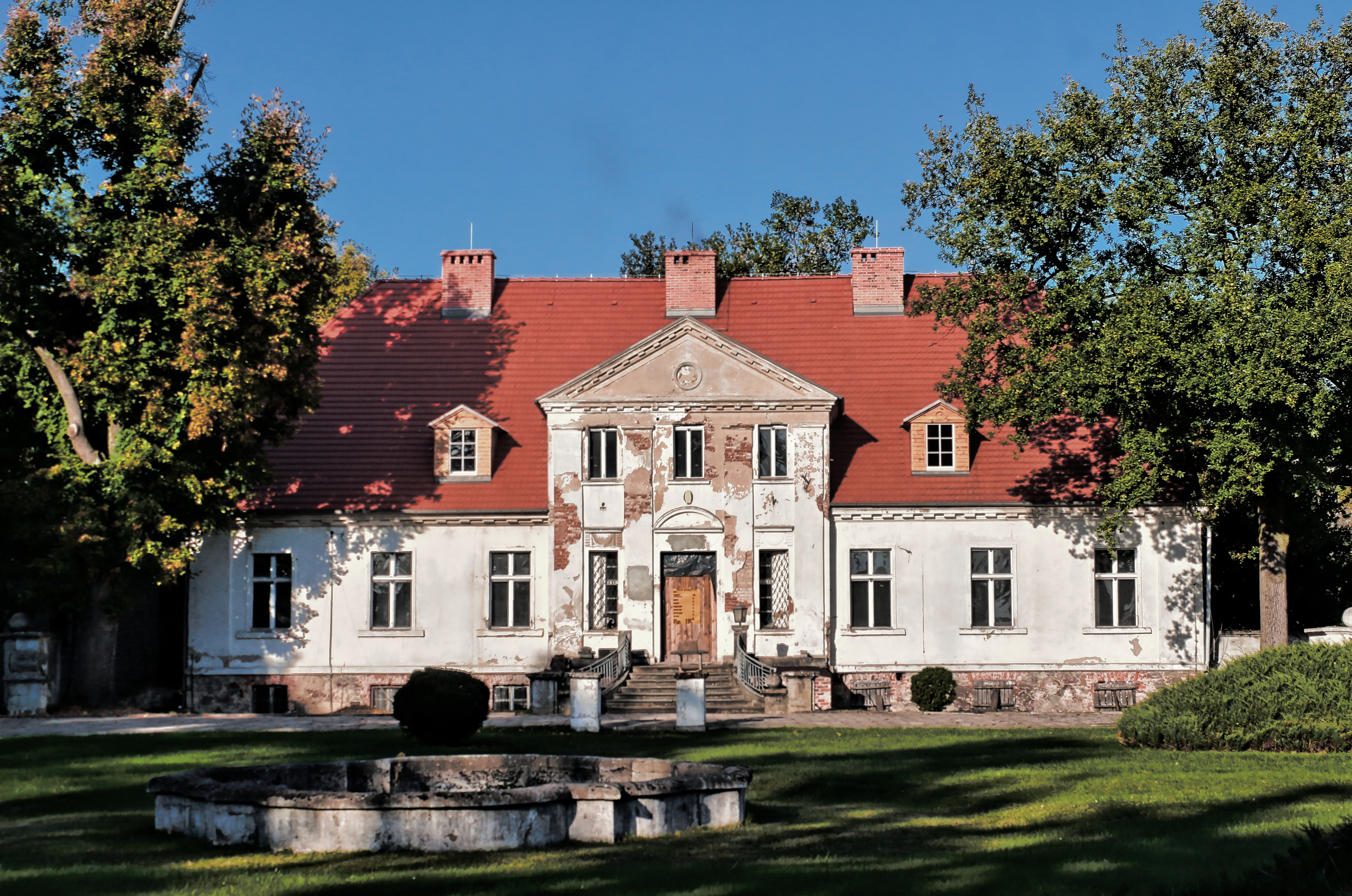
Manor house

The first mention of the village dates from 1325, when it was called Rudegeri Villa.

The Church of St. Fabian and St. Sebastian, built in the 14th century, is the oldest historical building in Osowa Sień. It is a single-aisle building, made of stone with a use of bricks. Baroque interior comes from the 18th century. Inside there is as well the sculpture of Christ from the 16th century and the Renaissance tombstones of a former landlords from Żychliński and Ossowski family.

In the village there is also a neoclassical palace complex built between 1890-1904 and a Classicist manor from the beginning of the 19th century, both surrounded by large park areas.

== Notable residents ==
- Leonie Ossowski (1925–2019); author

== Bibliography ==
- Martin Sprungala: Wsie na pograniczu głogowsko-wielkopolskim. Zarys dziejów wybranych miejscowości. Sława - Wijewo 2010, ISBN 978-83-932235-0-3
