= Lgiń =

- Village
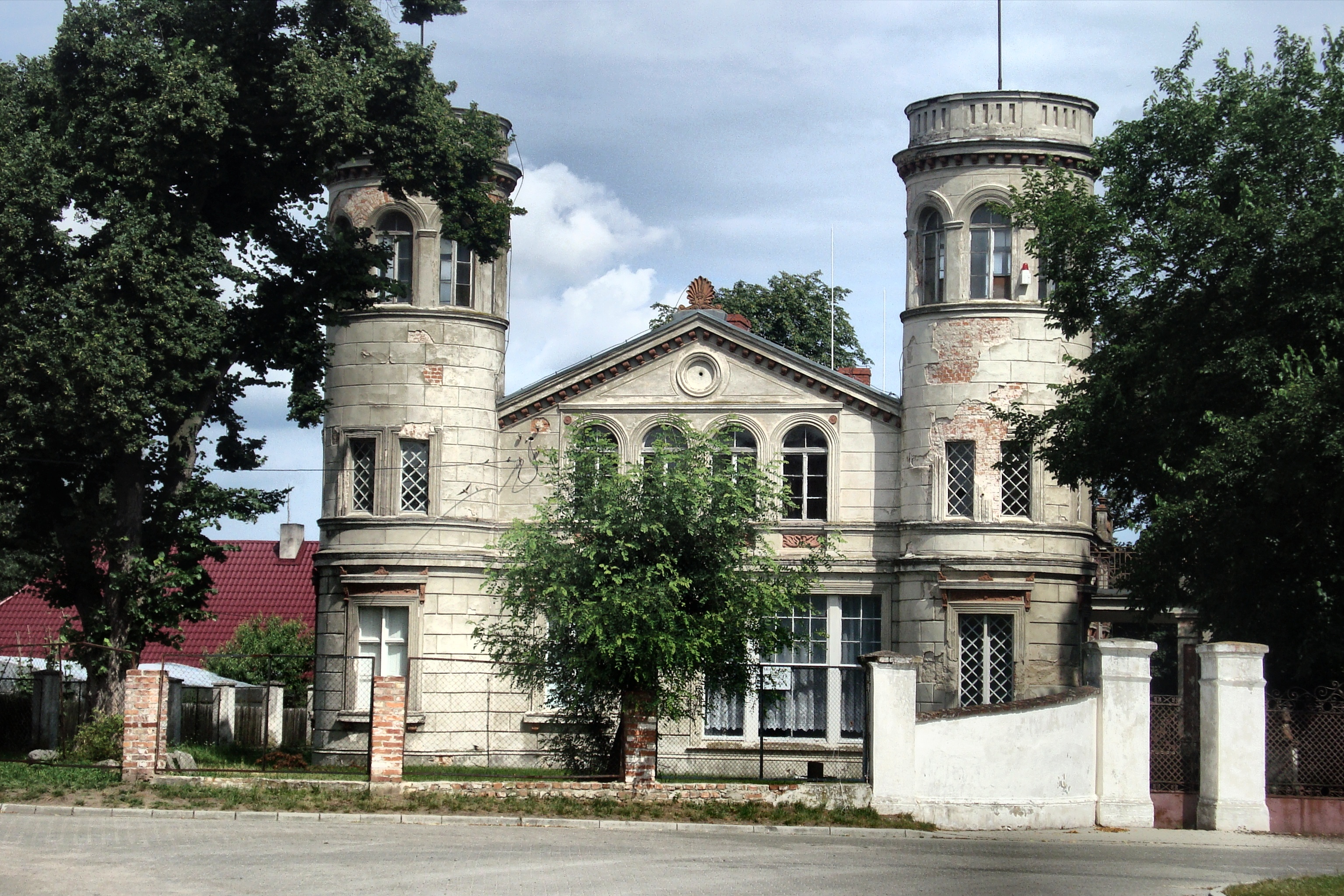
- Manor in Lgiń

- Location within Poland
- Coordinates: 51°52′37″N 16°14′44″E
- Country: Poland
- Voivodeship: Lubusz
- County: Wschowa
- Gmina: Wschowa

Lgiń [lɡiɲ] (German: Ilgen) is a resort village in the administrative district of Gmina Wschowa, within Wschowa County, Lubusz Voivodeship, in western Poland. It lies approximately 10 km from Wschowa, and 64 km away from Voivodeship capital, Zielona Góra.

The town was originally associated with Wielkopolska. It has a mediaeval metric and has existed since at least the beginning of the 14th century. Mentioned in a document written in Latin from 1311 as Ylegin, 1312 Iligin, 1312 Lygin, 1312 Oligin, 1397 Elgino, 1407 Lgin, 1473 Lgyn, 1944 Ilgen.

However, the neighbourhood of the village was settled earlier than the preserved archival records. On the western shore of a smaller lake, on the eastern shore of this lake, on a slope located northwest of the cemetery and on the dune, archeologists have discovered traces of four sediments dating back to the middle of the 10th century and the middle of the 13th century. Fractions of vessels were also discovered in the village. The expected fifth settlement remains unlocalised.

In the years 1311-12, Henryk II, the Duke of Głogów and Wielkopolska, issued documents in Lgin. In 1423, the town was the seat of its own parish in the deanery of Wschowa. In 1520 it belonged to the Wschowa district of the Crown of the Kingdom of Poland.

The village was initially ducal and later noble property belonging to the local Wielkopolska nobility from the Polish Lginski families, and later the Opalins of the Łódź and Kęszycki coats of arms. As private property, it was inherited and sold, thanks to which many historical legal documents about the village were preserved, reflecting property relations. In 1397, Szczedrzyk from Runów near Kórnik was on trial with Pietrasz and his brothers Mikołaj, Szczedrzyk, Bartosz and Czerna from Jerka for half of Lgiń. In the years 1476–1531, the owner of the village was Małgorzata ne Budziszewo, wife of Hincza Lgiński, and then the wife of Andrzej Osiecki from Osieczna. In 1473, King Kazimierz Jagiellończyk of Poland testified that Henry of Osowa Sienia had given to the castellan of Ladzki and the starost of Wschów Wojciech Górski a part in the village of Dębowa Łęka, which his wife Katarzyna of Jarocin gave him in exchange for the estates of Lgiń, Hetmanice and Nowa Wieś near Wschowa. In the 15th century, a parish church was erected in Lgińscy.

The town was a border village between the Crown of the Kingdom of Poland and the Duchy of Głogów. In 1528, the village along with the neighbourhood was recorded in the description of this border. It was a river flowing out of the pond, on which stood a mill called "Schubertmyl" located in the Kingdom of Poland between the villages of Lgiń and Wygnańczyce, as well as the river on which lay the mill "Takemil" below the mill "Schubertsmyl" which is the border between Lgiń and Wygnańczyce in the Kingdom and Stroń in the principality. The border mounds were located on the shore in the forest called "Szak", above the stream called "Szak", next to the pond called "Święte", by the swamp "Kaduskie mud". The corner mound that ended this section separated Lgiń in the Crown of the Kingdom of Poland from the two now non-existent villages of Strońska and Zbierska located in the Duchy of Głogów. Further, the border ran through the mounds at the swamp called "Miedźwiedzi Kierz", on the hill, i.e. on the ridge, opposite the innkeeper's meadow, to the corner mound under the Wijewski forest. At the end of the aforementioned inn meadow, there was a border that separated Lgiń and Wijewo in the Kingdom from Zbiersk in the Duchy of Głogów.

The town has also been recorded in the tax registres. In 1531, taxes were collected from 3 lans after the verdunek, from two inns for 6 groszy. In 1535 from 3 lanes, two inns and from three "korrzeczniki" or grain mills powered by a water wheel set on rivers. In 1563, taxes were collected from 7 lanes, two inns, and 6 water mills. In 1564, the village of Lgiń had 3 lanes. In 1566, the village belonged to the castellan of Przemęcki Andrzej Opaliński, who paid tax on 7 fields, two inns, a mill with 7 wheels, 10 farmsteaders for 4 groszy, farmers without a rod 2 groszy, 2 bailiffs because of their poverty for two cents. In 1579, taxes were collected from the village from 7.5 lans, 13 farmers with farmers, a simmer, four fishermen, 3 craftsmen, 8 bailiffs with inventory, 6 bailiffs without inventory and from a shepherd grazing a herd of 150 sheep.

In the 17th century, the town belonged to the castellan of Poznań, Łukasz Opaliński. Until the 17th century, the chapel of St. Anna. On one wall of this chapel there was a Latin inscription indicating that in 1476 it was founded by Małgorzata Lgińska. Church books written from 1693 were preserved in the village until the 19th century, and in it notes about historical events in the town and the surrounding area: including the plague of locusts, which had in the years 1728-1729, about the killing of the Jesuit of Wschów Michał Krygier in 1730 and about the Turkish en enpost who came to Wschowa in 1737.

As a result of the Second Partition of the Republic of Poland in 1793, the town passed into the possession of Prussia and, like the whole of Wielkopolska, found itself in the Prussian partition. In the second half of the 19th century, the 19th-century Geographical Dictionary of the Kingdom of Poland recorded as a village of Lgiń located in the Wschów district. In 1884, there were 77 houses in the village, inhabited by 548 residents, of which 23 were Evangelical and 525 Catholic. At that time, 89 illiterates were recorded in the village. In the vicinity of the village there was also a farm called Peterklucz Klitscherei with 10 houses, 171 residents, including 23 Catholics and 148 Catholics. It also included 22 illiterates. The farmhouse had a distillery and a steam-powered mill. The town then belonged to Stanisław Chłapowski, son of Dezydery. In the middle of the 19th century, a new parish church built in the Gothic style, which was consecrated by Archbishop Leon Przyłuski, was the beginning and endeavour of the heiress from Modlibowski Kęszycka.

In the years 1975-1998, the town was administratively part of the Leszczynśkie Voivodeship.

On June 25, 2009, 472 people lived in the village.

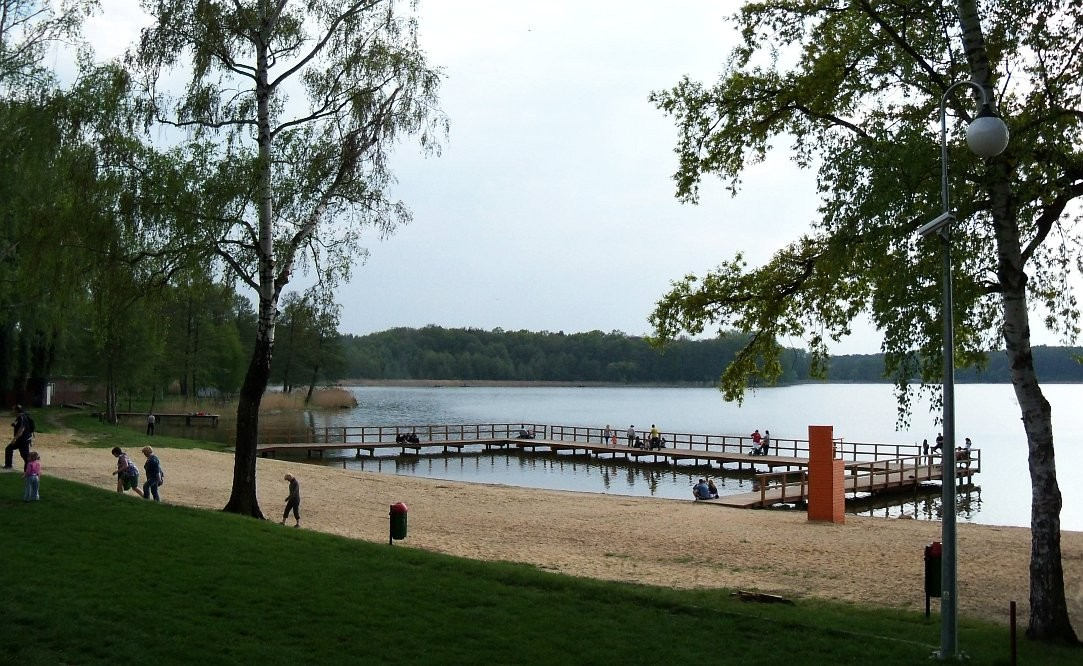
Great Lake

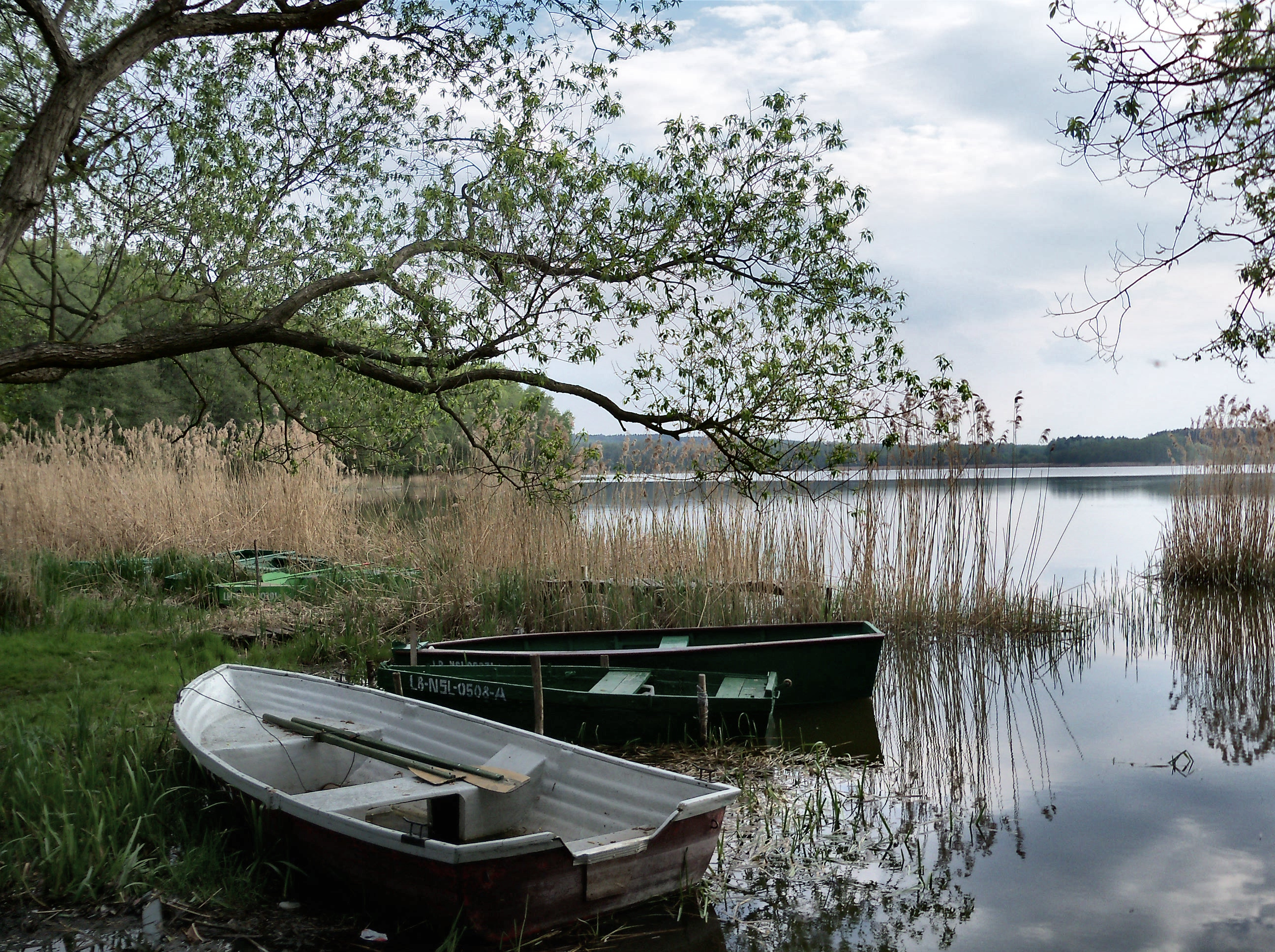
Small Lake
