= Łaszewo-Wietrznik =

Village in Gmina Siemiątkowo, Poland

- Village
- Location within Poland
- Coordinates: 52°51′21″N 20°05′17″E
- Country: Poland
- Voivodeship: Masovian
- County: Żuromin
- Gmina: Siemiątkowo

Łaszewo-Wietrznik [waˈʂɛvɔ ˈvjɛtʂnik] is a village in the administrative district of Gmina Siemiątkowo, within Żuromin County, Masovian Voivodeship, in east-central Poland.
