= Leonie Ossowski =

German writer (1925–2019)

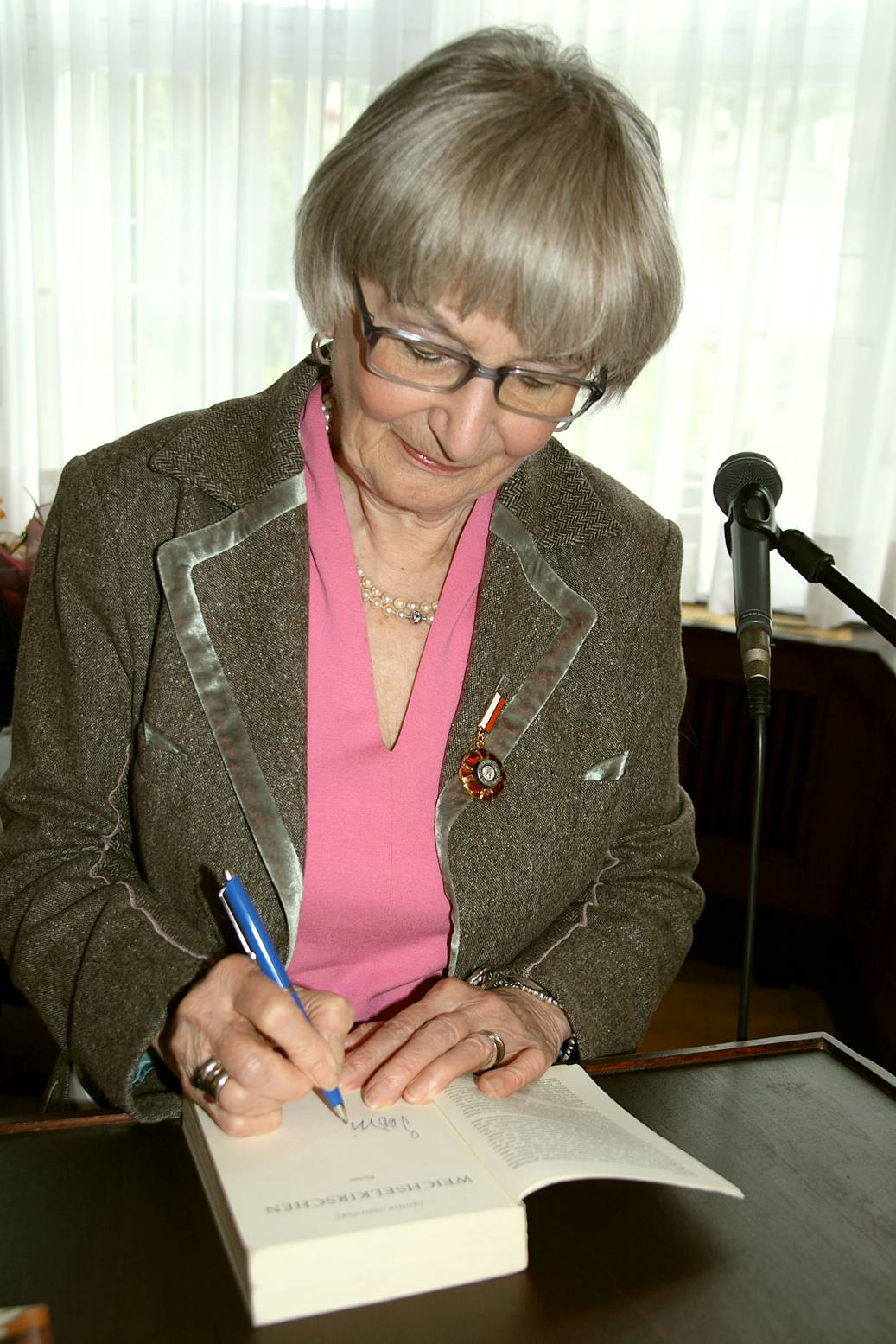
- Ossowski in 2007
- Born: Jolanthe von Brandenstein; 15 August 1925; Röhrsdorf, Posen-West Prussia, Weimar Germany
- Died: 4 February 2019 (aged 93); Berlin, Germany
- Writing career
- Genres: short story, novel, children's literature, screenplay
- Notable awards: Hermann Kesten Medal; Andreas Gryphius Prize; Adolf-Grimme-Preis

Jolanthe von Brandenstein (15 August 1925 – 4 February 2019), known by her pen name Leonie Ossowski, was a German writer. She also wrote under the name Jo Tiedemann. She wrote novels, including the novel for young adults Die große Flatter which was filmed as an award-winning TV play, screenplays such as for Zwei Mütter, stories and non-fiction books. Notable awards include the Hermann Kesten Medal of the Pen Centre and the Adolf-Grimme-Preis.

== Career ==
Ossowski was born Jolanthe von Brandenstein in Röhrsdorf (now Osowa Sień) in Posen-West Prussia, the daughter of Lothar von Brandenstein (1893–1953), an estate owner, and writer Ruth von Ostau (1899–1966). Her elder sister was Yvonne who became an actress. At the end of World War II, she fled to Bad Salzungen in Thuringia, then moved to Hesse. She finally settled in Upper Swabia.

Ossowski worked at various jobs, including sales clerk, factory worker and photo lab assistant. Beginning in the 1950s, she also wrote short stories under her pen name. On a visit to the GDR in 1953, she received a commission from the state-owned film studio DEFA for a screenplay. She wrote the script for Zwei Mütter, which was directed by Frank Beyer and premiered on 28 June 1957. A year later, she published the novel Stern ohne Himmel (Star Without a Sky), which was later made into a film.

Ossowski moved with her family to Mannheim in 1958. In 1968, she published a novel in West Germany for the first time. She also published stories (Erzählungen), non-fiction books, screen plays and stage plays. She was a member of the PEN Centre Germany. In the 1970s, she was a social worker, caring for young people in prison and installing communal housing (Wohngemeinschaft) for young people released from prison.

She visited her birthplace in 1974, and wrote a trilogy of novels about the war and post-war periods there, showing empathy for the Polish view. Her 1977 Die große Flatter (The Big Flutter), a novel for young adults, deals with two young homeless people in Mannhein. It was filmed as an award-winning three-part television play The Great Runaway with Richy Müller, presented in 1979.

Ossowski lived in Berlin from 1980 until her death on 4 February 2019. Among her seven children is the theologian Louis-Ferdinand von Zobeltitz.

== Awards ==
Ossowski was awarded the Hermann Kesten Medal of the PEN Centre in 2006. In 2014, she received the Andreas Gryphius Prize. She was awarded the Adolf-Grimme-Preis and the Schiller Prize of the City of Mannheim.

== Work ==
Ossowski's work often deals with people on the edge of society, and is entertaining but also educational. Her novel Stern ohne Himmel is part of the school canon.

Ossowki's works are held by the German National Library, including:

=== Novels and stories ===
- Stern ohne Himmel, novel, 1958. — Film 1980
- Wer fürchtet sich vorm schwarzen Mann?, novel, 1968
- Mannheimer Erzählungen, story collection, 1974
- Weichselkirschen, novel, 1976, part 1 of the Schlesien-Trilogie (Silesia trilogy)
- Die große Flatter, novel, 1977. — Film 1979
- Blumen für Magritte, stories, 1978
- Liebe ist kein Argument, novel, 1981. — Film 1984
- Wilhelm Meisters Abschied, novel, 1982
- Littel fasst einen Entschluss und andere Erzählungen, stories, 1983
- Neben der Zärtlichkeit, novel, 1984
- Wolfsbeeren, novel, 1987, part 2 of the Schlesien-Trilogie
- Das Zinnparadies, 1988
- Weckels Angst, 1991
- Holunderzeit, novel, Hoffmann und Campe, Hamburg 1991, part 3 of the Schlesien-Trilogie
- Von Gewalt keine Rede. two stories, 1992
- Die Maklerin, novel, 1994
- Herrn Rudolfs Vermächtnis, novel, Hoffmann & Campe, Hamburg 1997, as Heyne Taschenbuch, Munich 1998, ISBN 3-453-13756-6.
- Das Dienerzimmer, novel, 1999
- Die schöne Gegenwart, novel, 2001
- Espenlaub, novel, 2003
- Der einarmige Engel, novel, 2004

=== Screen plays ===
- Zwei Mütter (1957)
- Tatort: Auf offener Straße (1971, TV)
- Weichselkirschen (1979, TV film)
- The Great Runaway (1979, TV miniseries)
- Stern ohne Himmel (1980)
- Voll auf der Rolle (1985, TV film)
- No Mention of Violence (1991, TV film)

=== Non-fiction ===
- Zur Bewährung ausgesetzt. Bericht über Versuche kollektiver Bewährungshilfe. Piper, Munich 1972
- Der Löwe im Zinnparadies. Eine Wiederbegegnung. Piper, Munich 2003
