= Klucz, Lubusz Voivodeship =

Klucz
- Settlement
- Location within Poland
- Coordinates: 51°51′33″N 16°13′28″E
- Country: Poland
- Voivodeship: Lubusz
- County: Wschowa
- Gmina: Wschowa

Klucz [klut͡ʂ] is a settlement in the administrative district of Gmina Wschowa, within Wschowa County, Lubusz Voivodeship, in western Poland.
