= Karolinowo, Żuromin County =

Karolinowo
- Village
- Location within Poland
- Coordinates: 52°52′03″N 19°58′03″E
- Country: Poland
- Voivodeship: Masovian
- County: Żuromin
- Gmina: Siemiątkowo

Karolinowo [karɔliˈnɔvɔ] is a village in the administrative district of Gmina Siemiątkowo, within Żuromin County, Masovian Voivodeship, in east-central Poland.
