= Dołęga coat of arms =

Polish coat of arms

Dołęga
- Battle cry: Dołęga
- Alternative names: Dolanga, Dolenga, Dolega, Dolegi
- Earliest mention: 1345
- Towns: none
- Families: 302 names altogether: Arcimowicz, Babicki, Babiłło, Baczewski, Bartnicki, Bogaszycki, Boguszycki, Bołtuć, Borejka, Borejko, Borejko, Boreyka, Borowski, Borsa, Borsza, Brudzewski, Bruszewski, Burczak, Burnak, Bychawski, Bykowski, Bywalkiewicz, Carnevalli, Cebryszewski, Cebrzyszewski, Cegielski, Cieszkowski, Czygański, Czyndacki, Dargiłowicz, Dąbrowski, Diakiewicz, Dłużniewski, Dmiński, Dniński, Doblinowicz, Dobrzykowski, Dołęga, Dołęgowski, Dołobowski, Dołumbowski, Dombrowicz, Domniewski, Dramiński, Dulowski, Duzinkiewicz, Dymiński, Dziedzicki, Dziedzielewicz, Dzięgielewski, Eminowicz, Fechner, Fedorowicz, Felden, Frączek, Fudakowski, Gajewnicki, Galemski, Gikont, Giryn, Giziński, Głębski, Główczyński, Gorecki, Gotgin, Górecki, Grabowski, Grabski, Grunwalt, Guzowski, Gzowski, Horodelski, Jadkiewicz, Janczewski, Jerzmanowski, Jurgielewski, Kadowski, Kalicki, Kamieński, Kamiński, Kawiecki, Kliczewski, Kniaźnin, Kobiernicki, Kolankowski, Komorowski, Kossowski, Kowalewski, Kowalowski, Kretkowski, Kubaska, Kuberski, Kurklański, Kuszewicz, Kutklański, Lach, Lamparski, Lasocki, Laszany, Leski, Lewandowski, Liberacki, Liberadzki, Lipniewicz, Luberacki, Luberadzki, Luboradzki, Lusczkowski, Lusiński, Łączyński, Łęski, Łukoski, Łukowski, Łukowski, Łukowski na Łukoszynie, Mackowicz, Mackun, Makowiecki, Mazowiecki, Mąstowicz, Monstowicz, Monstwild, Mostowski, Mostowt, Mycielski, Myśliborski, Nalepiński, Niski, Nitosławski, Nitostawski, Nosarzewski, Olsiejko, Osiecki, Osowski, Ossowski, Ostrowicki, Otocki, Owicki, Owidzki, Peldowicz, Pełdowicz, Pierzyński, Pietraszewicz, Piskorek, Piskorski, Podkowicz, Podymiński, Polichnowski, Prialgauskas, Proniewicz, Prysiewicz, Pryssewicz, Przyałgowski, Pschyrembel, Roskowski, Roszkowski, Rościecki, Ruchladko, Rurawski, Rusieński, Rychalski, Rycharski, Rykacki, Rykaczewski, Rykaszewski, Rząśnicki, Rząźnicki, Rzepiszewski, Rzepiszowski, Saim, Sapieszko, Sierakowski, Składkowski, Składowski, Skłodowski, Skłotowski, Skonieczny, Słocki, Slocki, Slucki, Sobiński, Srebrowski, Srzeński, Starozębski, Starozrzębski, Staroźrebski, Stawiński, Stroiński, Stroński, Stryjowski, Strzeński, Suszewski, Sutocki, Sutowicz, Szarszewski, Szczepankowski, Szczepański, Szczerbiński, Szczutowski, Szczytowski, Szernel, Szornel, Szreński, Szyrma, Szyszka, Truchelski, Trupelski, Trzciński, Turowski, Turski, Tuzinkiewicz, Uciński, Uliński, Uścieński, Uściński, Uśiński, Wermiński, Weyden, Witkowicki, Wolniewicz, Wrzosek, Wybczyński, Wypczyński, Zabieński, Zakrzewski, Zaleski, Ząbieński, Zeleski, Zieleniecki, Zieleniewski, Żabieński, Żabiński, Żebrański, Żeleski

Dołęga (pronunciation: Polish pronunciation: [doˈwɛŋɡa]) is a Polish coat of arms. It was used by several szlachta families in the times of the Polish–Lithuanian Commonwealth.

== Blazon ==
"Azure, a downward opened horse-shoe argent with a cross paty or charged on the edge of its arch. Inside the horse-shoe an argent arrow whose downward point protrudes. Helmet with mantling azure, lined argent. Crowned. Crest: a vulture's wing with an argent arrow shot through." There are four varieties of the coat of arms of which one is shown on RHS of top of the page.

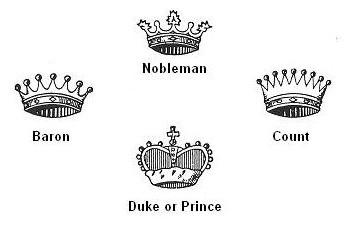
Polish Nobility Crowns

== History ==
This coat-of-arms appears in 1345, as the seal of Mysliborz, a Judge of Dobrzyn (Dobrzyń nad Wisłą).

In a 1373 manuscript of Jan, the Bishop of Płock, the village of Łeg is first mentioned as a Dołęga Clan possession.

It is surrounded by villages once owned by Dołęga Clan families. These are: Dabrowa, Dziedzice, Grabow, Gzino, Koskowo, Luzniewo, Mlice, Osiek, Ossowa, Zakrzewo, Zalesie, and others, owned respectively by the Dabrowski, Dziedzicki, Grabowski, Gzinski, Koskowski, Luzniewski, Mlicki, Osiecki, Ossowski, Zakrzewski, and Zaleski families etc. These villages and Płock are in the Masovian region of east Poland.

In 1413 the Act of Horodlo Union the Dołęga crest was transferred to Lithuania. Many of the clan families emigrating at the beginning of the seventeenth century migrated to Lithuania. Some settled in the parish areas of Vilnius, given land and properties from Russians who were either killed or exiled.

A court record of 1373 describes the war cry as "Do Langa". In records after 1400 the two words merge as "Dolanga," then more recently as Dołęga. "Do łęga" means "To Łeg!" and perhaps served as a rallying point in times of conflict, or for the local clan celebrations.

Others say Dołęga means "To Bows" a cry to arms as the enemy approached. Another source says the word Dołęga in old Polish, meant potent - having great physical strength, forcefulness.

The coat was borne in Poland in King Boleslaw Krzywousty's (1102–1139) war against the Prussians. While defending a castle under siege, Polish knights ambushed the Prussian army. A knight named Dołęga shot the hoof of the Prussian army commander's horse with his crossbow so well that the Prussian commander was thrown from it. The Polish knights captured and executed him during the ambush. This inspired the Polish people to rise up and attack, and the Prussians were driven back by Polish sabers. Dołęga took an arrow in the appendix, but the battle was won. As a reward for his amazing shot, the King granted him a coat of arms after his name, Dołęga. The coat of arms he received depicts a raven wing, the heraldic symbol of loyalty and faith, and a horseshoe representing the horse hoof he shot.

Dołęga Manor House

There is a village named Prusy which ostensibly for purposes of inheritance, was divided up among Dołęga Clan members. The name of this village may have given rise to the 'myth', that at one time, Dołęga clansmen might have defeated and captured Prussian (Baltic-speaking) enemies, and reduced them to serfs on their various properties.

Also there is a village called Dołęga in Małopolskie district of southern Poland which has a well-preserved nineteenth-century szlachta noble manor house (now a museum) surrounded by a natural forest park, in which there is a small chapel built by the nobleman owner. It was quite common for the nobleman to provide money/men to build the village church or chapel depending on size and riches of the family.

In December 1990, the Ulanów City Council, Nisko County, Subcarpathian Voivodeship, Southern Poland adopted Resolution No. X/54/90 on granting the Statute of the Municipality and the City Lancers in which it was given municipality and city coat of arms "Dołęga" in the image and shape of which used the city founder Stanislaw de Ulin Magna Uliński. The image of the coat of arms was placed on the building of the municipality and town in the national emblem as well as the seals and the Board of Municipal and Town.

== Variations ==
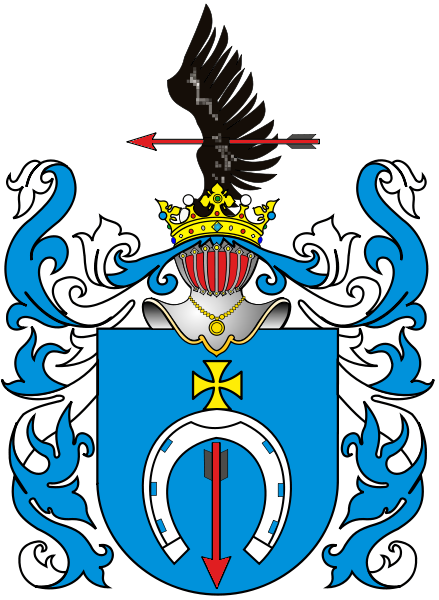
Coat of arms of Dąbrowski I

== Notable bearers ==
Notable bearers of this coat of arms include:

- Maria Skłodowska-Curie - Physicist and Chemist (c. 1900)
- Aleksander Kakowski - Cardinal Archbishop of Warsaw (c. 1920)
- Tadeusz Dołęga-Mostowicz - Polish Journalist and Author
- Dołęga-Ossowski - Family (c. 1400-c. 1900)
- Dołęga-Mycielski - Family
- Wacław Michał Zaleski - Poet, Politician (1799–1849)
- Tadeusz Mazowiecki - Polish Journalist, Author, Politician (1927–2013)
- Paweł Włodkowic
- Jan Dołęga-Zakrzewski - Politician (1866–1936)
- Roch Dołęga-Kossowski - Politician and Treasurer of the Crown (c. 1760)
- Aleksander Kadow - Living in U.S. Possesses Notarized Nobility documents dating back 1400s. Title of Count.

== See also ==
- Polish heraldry
- Heraldry
- Coat of arms
- Coat of arms of Dąbrowski I - variation of Dołęga
