= Barbara Frączek =

Polish physician and politician (1941–2023)

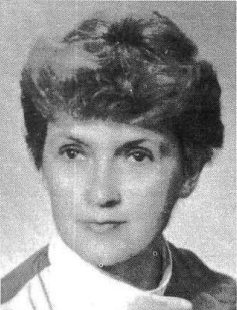
- Frączek in 1993

Member of the Sejm
- In office 25 November 1991 – 31 May 1993
- Constituency: District No.29
- Incumbent
- Assumed office 20 October 1997
- Constituency: District No.38

Personal details
- Born: 3 December 1941 Lviv, General Government
- Died: 24 December 2023 (aged 82)
- Party: Solidarity Electoral Action
- Education: Medical University of Warsaw
- Occupation: Physician

Barbara Franciszka Frączek (née Krzaklewska; 3 December 1941 – 24 December 2023) was a Polish physician and politician. She served in the Sejm from 1991 to 1993 and again from 1997 to 2001.

== Biography ==
Frączek was the daughter of the surgeon Stanisław Krzaklewski and sister of Marian Krzaklewski. In 1965, she graduated from the Faculty of Medicine of the Medical University of Warsaw, then specialized in ophthalmology. She worked as a senior assistant at the Provincial Hospital in Rzeszów. In 1980, she became an activist of Solidarity and sat on the regional authorities of the union. On their behalf, she served as an Sejm member for the first term (1991–1993). She was also a Sejm member of the third term from the Solidarity Electoral Action list (1997–2001). She co-created the AWS health insurance program. She was also involved in supporting health care facilities in the Rzeszów region and activities for the local arms industry.

In 2001, Frączek retired from politics, continuing to practice medicine. An activist of Catholic movements, she was, among others, president of the local "Tak Życiu" association, supporting single mothers and large families. She was also the chairwoman of the Ethics Committee of the District Medical Chamber in Rzeszów.

Frączek was married and had two sons. She lived in Rzeszów and died on 24 December 2023. Five days later, she was buried in the Catholic Cemetery in Kolbuszowa.
