= Pietrzyk (surname) =

Pietrzyk is a Polish surname, like Pietrzak and Pietrzykowski, developed from the given name Piotr, when it was still Pietr, before it stabilized in its present form, Piotr, following the so-called Polish umlaut. The Pietrzyk declension is very old, having been recorded as early as the 12th century.

The suffix -ak, like -yk, indicates the paternal origin of the surname; it expressed a diminutive form with a positive emotional connotation; when added to the name Piotr, it likely meant Piotr's son. Archaic feminine forms are Pietrzykowa (by husband), Pietrzykówna (by father); they still can be used colloquially. It may be transliterated as: Petrzyk, Petrzik, Petrzhyk, Petrzhik, Petshik, Петшик.

Notable people with this surname include the following:

- Agata Pietrzyk (born 1988), Polish freestyle wrestler
- Alojzy Pietrzyk (born 1951), Polish politician, trade union activist, member of the Sejm
- Andrzej Pietrzyk (born 1953), major general of the Polish Army, military analyst
- Edward Pietrzyk (1949–2021), Polish military officer, diplomat and general in the Polish Arm
- Jerzy Pietrzyk (born 1955), Polish sprinter
- Katarzyna Pietrzyk (born 1966) – Polish journalist and politician, member of the Sejm
- Kazimierz Pietrzyk (born 1942), Polish politician, member of the Sejm, sports activist
- Leslie Pietrzyk (born 1961), American author
- Lucyna Pietrzyk (born 1956), Polish policewoman, politician, member of the Sejm
- Stanisław Pietrzyk (1895–1965), lieutenant colonel of infantry of the Polish Army, independence activist

== See also ==
- Pietrzyk, village in Gmina Lutocin, Żuromin County, Masovian Voivodeship, east-central Poland
- Pietrzyki, village in Gmina Pisz, Pisz County, Warmian-Masurian Voivodeship, northern Poland
