= Pietrzyki =

- Village
- Location within Poland
- Coordinates: 53°37′N 21°56′E
- Country: Poland
- Voivodeship: Warmian-Masurian
- County: Pisz
- Gmina: Pisz

Pietrzyki [pjɛˈtʂɨki] (German: Wiesenheim) is a village in the administrative district of Gmina Pisz, within Pisz County, Warmian-Masurian Voivodeship, in northern Poland.

== See also ==
- Pietrzyk (surname)
- Pietrzyk, village in Gmina Lutocin, Żuromin County, Masovian Voivodeship, east-central Poland
