= Ludwika Szczęsna =

Polish religious sister and Blessed

Blessed Klara Szczęsna, S.S.C.J.
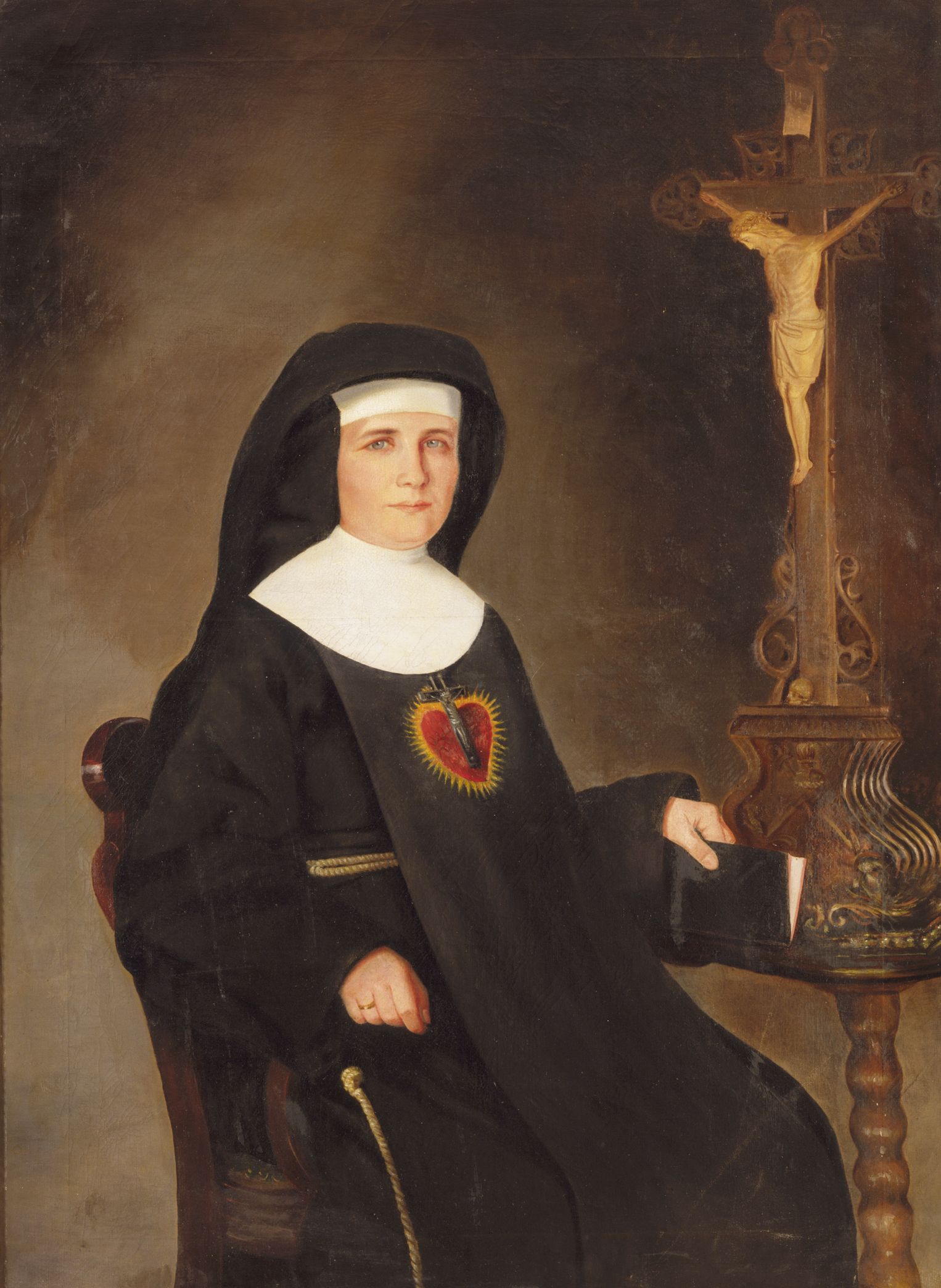

Virgin and foundress
- Born: Ludwika Szczęsna; 18 July 1863; Cieszki, Lubowidz, Żuromin, Congress Poland
- Died: 7 February 1916 (aged 52); Kraków, Kingdom of Poland
- Venerated in: Catholic Church (Poland)
- Beatified: 27 September 2015, Kraków, Poland by Cardinal Angelo Amato, S.D.B.
- Feast: 7 February

Klara Szczęsna, S.S.C.J. (18 July 1863 – 7 February 1916) was a Polish Catholic religious sister. She was the co-founder of the Sisters, Servants of the Most Sacred Heart of Jesus which she established with Józef Sebastian Pelczar.

She was approved for beatification in 2015 after Pope Francis recognized a miracle that was found to have been attributed to her intercession. The beatification was celebrated on 27 September 2015 in Poland; Angelo Amato presided on behalf of the pope.

== Life ==
She was born Ludwika Szczęsna in Poland in 1863 as the sixth of seven children of Antoni Szczęsny and Franciszka Skorupska. Her mother oversaw her education at home but this was cut short with her mother's death when she was twelve. She continued to live with her father albeit with his second wife.

Her father wanted to arrange a marriage for her when she was seventeen but she opposed this and announced to him her intention to follow her vocation and become a professed religious. She left her home at this time in order to follow her calling and she worked as a seamstress until she was 22 in Mława. She – at this time – became a spiritual student of Honorat Koźminski. She joined the Servants of Jesus in 1885, and worked as a tailor in addition to serving as the Superior to the local chapter. She was soon given the task of running a shelter for women in Kraków.

Szczęsna soon met Józef Sebastian Pelczar in 1893 and the two went on to establish a religious congregation on 15 April 1894. It was after the establishment that she assumed the religious name Klara in honor of Saint Clare of Assisi. The motto that was selected for the new congregation was "All for the Heart of Jesus". She served as the first Superior General and opened over 30 houses with the aim of tending to women as well as the sick; this work intensified with the outbreak of World War I.

She died at the beginning of 1916 during World War I. Pelczar continued her work after her death until he died in 1924.

== Beatification ==
The beatification process commenced on 7 April 1994 despite the fact that the local process in Kraków had started on 25 March 1994. The process concluded its work on 15 April 1996 and was ratified on 13 December 1996. The Positio – documentation assembled in the process – was submitted to the Congregation for the Causes of Saints in Rome in 2002. Pope Benedict XVI approved that she had lived a life of heroic virtue and proclaimed her to be venerable on 20 December 2012. The miracle required for beatification was investigated in a process that spanned from 25 April 2004 until 20 March 2007. The process was ratified in 2008 with the documentation sent to Rome. Pope Francis approved the miracle on 5 June 2015 allowing for her to be beatified on 27 September 2015.
