= Sebastian Kobiernicki =

Clerk and politician

Notary of Płock Land
- In office 1587–1587

Member of the Sejm of the Polish–Lithuanian Commonwealth
- In office 1587–1587
- Constituency: Płock Voivodeship
- In office 1582–1582
- Constituency: Płock Voivodeship
- In office 1576–1576
- Constituency: Płock Voivodeship

Representative in the Crown Tribunal
- In office 1585–1585

Personal details
- Died: 1596

Sebastian Kobiernicki (Polish: [sɛˈbas.tjan kɔ.bjɛrˈɲit͡s.ki]; died 1596) was a 16th-century clerk and politician in the Polish–Lithuanian Commonwealth. He was a member of parliament representing the Płock Voivodeship in the Sejm of the Polish–Lithuanian Commonwealth in 1576, 1582, and 1587. In 1585, he was a representative in the Crown Tribunal, and in 1587, he was a notary of the Płock Land. He was also a member of the nobility, and belonged to the heraldic clan of Dołęga coat of arms.
