= Poniatowo, Żuromin County =

Village in Masovian Voivodeship, Poland

Poniatowo
- Village
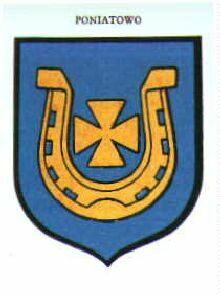
- Coat of arms

- Location within Poland
- Coordinates: 53°2′47″N 19°52′16″E
- Country: Poland
- Voivodeship: Masovian
- County: Żuromin
- Gmina: Żuromin
- Time zone: UTC+1 (CET)
  - Summer (DST): UTC+2 (CEST)
- Vehicle registration: WZU

Poniatowo [pɔɲaˈtɔvɔ] is a village in the administrative district of Gmina Żuromin, within Żuromin County, Masovian Voivodeship, in north-central Poland. It is situated on the Wkra River.

== History ==
Poniatowo was a private town, administratively located in the Szreńsk County in the Płock Voivodeship in the Greater Poland Province of the Kingdom of Poland.

A brewery and a vodka distillery were located in Poniatowo.

Two Polish citizens were murdered by Nazi Germany in the village during World War II.
