= Nowa Wieś, Gmina Kuczbork-Osada =

Nowa Wieś
- Village
- Location within Poland
- Coordinates: 53°8′7″N 20°3′37″E
- Country: Poland
- Voivodeship: Masovian
- County: Żuromin
- Gmina: Kuczbork-Osada
- Population: 300

Nowa Wieś [ˈnɔva ˈvjɛɕ] is a village in the administrative district of Gmina Kuczbork-Osada, within Żuromin County, Masovian Voivodeship, in east-central Poland.
