= Głęboka, Masovian Voivodeship =

Głęboka
- Village
- Location within Poland
- Coordinates: 53°2′N 19°45′E
- Country: Poland
- Voivodeship: Masovian
- County: Żuromin
- Gmina: Lutocin

Głęboka [ɡwɛmˈbɔka] is a village in the administrative district of Gmina Lutocin, within Żuromin County, Masovian Voivodeship, in east-central Poland.
