= Majdany-Leśniczówka =

- Settlement
- Location within Poland
- Coordinates: 53°05′27″N 19°44′25″E
- Country: Poland
- Voivodeship: Masovian
- County: Żuromin
- Gmina: Lubowidz

Majdany-Leśniczówka (Polish pronunciation: [majˈdanɨ lɛɕɲiˈtʂufka]) is a settlement in the administrative district of Gmina Lubowidz, within Żuromin County, Masovian Voivodeship, in east-central Poland.
