= Dębówka =

Dębówka may refer to the following places:

- Dębówka, Lublin Voivodeship (east Poland)
- Dębówka, Garwolin County in Masovian Voivodeship (east-central Poland)
- Dębówka, Podlaskie Voivodeship (north-east Poland)
- Dębówka, Gmina Góra Kalwaria in Masovian Voivodeship (east-central Poland)
- Dębówka, Sochaczew County in Masovian Voivodeship (east-central Poland)
- Dębówka, Warsaw West County in Masovian Voivodeship (east-central Poland)
- Dębówka, Żuromin County in Masovian Voivodeship (east-central Poland)
- Dębówka, Greater Poland Voivodeship (west-central Poland)
