= Purzyce =

- Village
- Location within Poland
- Coordinates: 53°4′N 19°43′E
- Country: Poland
- Voivodeship: Masovian
- County: Żuromin
- Gmina: Lubowidz

Purzyce [puˈʐɨt͡sɛ] is a village in the administrative district of Gmina Lubowidz, within Żuromin County, Masovian Voivodeship, in east-central Poland.
