= Kuczbork-Wieś =

- Village
- Location within Poland
- Coordinates: 53°4′N 20°2′E
- Country: Poland
- Voivodeship: Masovian
- County: Żuromin
- Gmina: Kuczbork-Osada
- Website: http://ugkuczbork.webpark.pl/

Kuczbork-Wieś [ˈkut͡ʂbɔrk ˈvjɛɕ] is a village in the administrative district of Gmina Kuczbork-Osada, within Żuromin County, Masovian Voivodeship, in east-central Poland.
