= Dębsk =

Dębsk may refer to the following places:

- Dębsk, Mława County in Masovian Voivodeship (north-central Poland)
- Dębsk, Płock County in Masovian Voivodeship (central Poland)
- Dębsk, Żuromin County in Masovian Voivodeship (north-central Poland)
