= Boguszewiec =

- Village
- Location within Poland
- Coordinates: 52°59′N 19°44′E
- Country: Poland
- Voivodeship: Masovian
- County: Żuromin
- Gmina: Lutocin
- Postal code: 09-317

Boguszewiec [bɔɡuˈʂɛvjɛt͡s] is a village in the administrative district of Gmina Lutocin, within Żuromin County, Masovian Voivodeship, in east-central Poland.

== Population ==
| Year | Residents |
|---|---|
| 2011 | 178 |
| 2021 | 156 |
