= Mianowo, Żuromin County =

Mianowo
- Village
- Location within Poland
- Coordinates: 53°6′N 20°5′E
- Country: Poland
- Voivodeship: Masovian
- County: Żuromin
- Gmina: Kuczbork-Osada

Mianowo [mjaˈnɔvɔ] is a village in the administrative district of Gmina Kuczbork-Osada, within Żuromin County, Masovian Voivodeship, in east-central Poland.
