= Jonne =

- Village
- Location within Poland
- Coordinates: 52°57′N 19°49′E
- Country: Poland
- Voivodeship: Masovian
- County: Żuromin
- Gmina: Lutocin

Jonne [ˈjɔnnɛ] is a village in the administrative district of Gmina Lutocin, within Żuromin County, Masovian Voivodeship, in east-central Poland.
