= Nowy Przeradz =

- Village
- Location within Poland
- Coordinates: 53°00′38″N 19°48′04″E
- Country: Poland
- Voivodeship: Masovian
- County: Żuromin
- Gmina: Lutocin

Nowy Przeradz [ˈnɔvɨ ˈpʂɛrat͡s] is a village in the administrative district of Gmina Lutocin, within Żuromin County, Masovian Voivodeship, in east-central Poland.
