= Sztok =

- Village
- Location within Poland
- Coordinates: 53°8′N 19°52′E
- Country: Poland
- Voivodeship: Masovian
- County: Żuromin
- Gmina: Lubowidz
- Population: 43

Sztok [ʂtɔk] is a village in the administrative district of Gmina Lubowidz, within Żuromin County, Masovian Voivodeship, in east-central Poland.
