= Przerodki-Kosmal =

- Settlement
- Location within Poland
- Coordinates: 53°11′17″N 19°53′18″E
- Country: Poland
- Voivodeship: Masovian
- County: Żuromin
- Gmina: Lubowidz

Przerodki-Kosmal [pʂɛˈrɔtki ˈkɔsmal] is a settlement in the administrative district of Gmina Lubowidz, within Żuromin County, Masovian Voivodeship, in east-central Poland.
