= Chrapoń, Gmina Lutocin =

Village in Gmina Lutocin, Poland

Chrapoń
- Village
- Location within Poland
- Coordinates: 53°0′1″N 19°42′33″E
- Country: Poland
- Voivodeship: Masovian
- County: Żuromin
- Gmina: Lutocin
- Time zone: UTC+1 (CET)
  - Summer (DST): UTC+2 (CEST)

Chrapoń [ˈxrapɔɲ] is a village in the administrative district of Gmina Lutocin, within Żuromin County, Masovian Voivodeship, in north-central Poland.

Six Polish citizens were murdered by Nazi Germany in the village during World War II.
