= Osowa, Masovian Voivodeship =

Osowa
- Village
- Location within Poland
- Coordinates: 53°5′N 20°5′E
- Country: Poland
- Voivodeship: Masovian
- County: Żuromin
- Gmina: Kuczbork-Osada

Osowa [ɔˈsɔva] is a village in the administrative district of Gmina Kuczbork-Osada, within Żuromin County, Masovian Voivodeship, in east-central Poland.
