= Kaleje, Masovian Voivodeship =

Kaleje
- Village
- Location within Poland
- Coordinates: 53°4′15″N 19°39′48″E
- Country: Poland
- Voivodeship: Masovian
- County: Żuromin
- Gmina: Lubowidz
- Population: 60

Kaleje [kaˈlɛjɛ] is a village in the administrative district of Gmina Lubowidz, within Żuromin County, Masovian Voivodeship, in east-central Poland.
