= Swojęcin =

- Village
- Location within Poland
- Coordinates: 53°1′N 19°52′E
- Country: Poland
- Voivodeship: Masovian
- County: Żuromin
- Gmina: Lutocin

Swojęcin [sfɔˈjɛnt͡ɕin] is a village in the administrative district of Gmina Lutocin, within Żuromin County, Masovian Voivodeship, in east-central Poland.
