= Kosewo =

Kosewo may refer to the following places:

- Kosewo, Gmina Nasielsk in Masovian Voivodeship (east-central Poland)
- Kosewo, Gmina Pomiechówek in Masovian Voivodeship (east-central Poland)
- Kosewo, Gmina Stary Lubotyń, Ostrów County in Masovian Voivodeship (east-central Poland)
- Kosewo, Żuromin County in Masovian Voivodeship (east-central Poland)
- Kosewo, Greater Poland Voivodeship (west-central Poland)
- Kosewo, Warmian-Masurian Voivodeship (north Poland)
