= Łążek, Masovian Voivodeship =

Łążek
- Village
- Location within Poland
- Coordinates: 53°9′N 20°6′E
- Country: Poland
- Voivodeship: Masovian
- County: Żuromin
- Gmina: Kuczbork-Osada

Łążek [ˈwɔ̃ʐɛk] is a village in the administrative district of Gmina Kuczbork-Osada, within Żuromin County, Masovian Voivodeship, in east-central Poland.
