= Żarnówka =

Żarnówka may refer to the following places:

- Żarnówka, Lesser Poland Voivodeship (south Poland)
- Żarnówka, Węgrów County in Masovian Voivodeship (east-central Poland)
- Żarnówka, Żuromin County in Masovian Voivodeship (east-central Poland)
