= Starcz =

- Village
- Location within Poland
- Coordinates: 53°1′36″N 19°42′47″E
- Country: Poland
- Voivodeship: Masovian
- County: Żuromin
- Gmina: Lutocin
- Population: 10

Starcz [start͡ʂ] is a village in the administrative district of Gmina Lutocin, within Żuromin County, Masovian Voivodeship, in east-central Poland.
