= Zdrojki-Piegowo =

- Settlement
- Location within Poland
- Coordinates: 53°05′53″N 19°41′26″E
- Country: Poland
- Voivodeship: Masovian
- County: Żuromin
- Gmina: Lubowidz

Zdrojki-Piegowo [ˈzdrɔi̯ki pjɛˈɡɔvɔ] is a settlement in the administrative district of Gmina Lubowidz, within Żuromin County, Masovian Voivodeship, in east-central Poland.
