= Bagienice Małe =

Bagienice Małe refers to the following places in Poland:

- Bagienice Małe, Masovian Voivodeship
- Bagienice Małe, Warmian-Masurian Voivodeship
