= Wygoda, Żuromin County =

Wygoda
- Village
- Location within Poland
- Coordinates: 53°06′20″N 20°02′10″E
- Country: Poland
- Voivodeship: Masovian
- County: Żuromin
- Gmina: Kuczbork-Osada

Wygoda [vɨˈɡɔda] is a village in the administrative district of Gmina Kuczbork-Osada, within Żuromin County, Masovian Voivodeship, in east-central Poland.
