= Przeradz Wielki =

- Village
- Location within Poland
- Coordinates: 53°1′N 19°48′E
- Country: Poland
- Voivodeship: Masovian
- County: Żuromin
- Gmina: Lutocin

Przeradz Wielki (Polish pronunciation: [ˈpʂɛrats ˈfjɛlkʲi]) is a village in the administrative district of Gmina Lutocin, within Żuromin County, Masovian Voivodeship, in east-central Poland.
