= Ruda, Żuromin County =

Ruda
- Village
- Location within Poland
- Coordinates: 53°09′12″N 19°51′36″E
- Country: Poland
- Voivodeship: Masovian
- County: Żuromin
- Gmina: Lubowidz
- Time zone: UTC+1 (CET)
  - Summer (DST): UTC+2 (CEST)

Ruda [ˈruda] is a village in the administrative district of Gmina Lubowidz, within Żuromin County, Masovian Voivodeship, in north-central Poland.
