= Szczypiorski =

Szczypiorski ([ˌʂt͡ʂɨpiˈɔrski], feminine: Szczypiorska, plural form: Szczypiorscy [ˌʂt͡ʂɨpiˈɔrst͡sɨ]) is a Polish surname derived from the Polish word szczypior for "chive", therefore either an occupational name for a person growing or selling this herb or a habitational name for a person from several Polish locations named after this garden plant (e. g. Szczypiorno, Szczypiornia). Notable people with the surname include:

- Adam Szczypiorski (1895–1979), Polish politician, historian and trade union activist
- Andrzej Szczypiorski (1928–2000), Polish novelist and politician
- Krzysztof Szczypiorski (born 1973), Polish computer scientist
