= Kozilas =

- Village
- Location within Poland
- Coordinates: 53°9′47″N 19°53′53″E
- Country: Poland
- Voivodeship: Masovian
- County: Żuromin
- Gmina: Lubowidz

Kozilas [kɔˈʑilas] is a village in the administrative district of Gmina Lubowidz, within Żuromin County, Masovian Voivodeship, in east-central Poland.
