= Olszewko, Masovian Voivodeship =

Olszewko
- Village
- Location within Poland
- Coordinates: 53°3′N 20°2′E
- Country: Poland
- Voivodeship: Masovian
- County: Żuromin
- Gmina: Kuczbork-Osada

Olszewko [ɔlˈʂɛfkɔ] is a village in the administrative district of Gmina Kuczbork-Osada, within Żuromin County, Masovian Voivodeship, in east-central Poland.
