= Ruda Kurzyska =

- Settlement
- Location within Poland
- Coordinates: 53°08′56″N 19°51′41″E
- Country: Poland
- Voivodeship: Masovian
- County: Żuromin
- Gmina: Lubowidz

Ruda Kurzyska [ˈruda kuˈʐɨska] is a settlement in the administrative district of Gmina Lubowidz, within Żuromin County, Masovian Voivodeship, in east-central Poland.
