= Chojnowo, Żuromin County =

Chojnowo
- Village
- Location within Poland
- Coordinates: 53°6′N 20°3′E
- Country: Poland
- Voivodeship: Masovian
- County: Żuromin
- Gmina: Kuczbork-Osada
- Time zone: UTC+1 (CET)
  - Summer (DST): UTC+2 (CEST)
- Postal code: 09-310
- Vehicle registration: WZU

Chojnowo [xɔi̯ˈnɔvɔ] is a village in the administrative district of Gmina Kuczbork-Osada, within Żuromin County, Masovian Voivodeship, in north-central Poland.

== History ==
During the German occupation in World War II, the occupiers operated a forced labour camp for Poles and Jews in the village from June to November 1940.
