= Kliczewo Duże =

- Village
- Location within Poland
- Coordinates: 53°3′N 20°0′E
- Country: Poland
- Voivodeship: Masovian
- County: Żuromin
- Gmina: Żuromin

Kliczewo Duże [kliˈt͡ʂɛvɔ ˈduʐɛ] is a village in the administrative district of Gmina Żuromin, within Żuromin County, Masovian Voivodeship, in east-central Poland.
