= Psota =

- Settlement
- Location within Poland
- Coordinates: 53°1′11″N 19°43′53″E
- Country: Poland
- Voivodeship: Masovian
- County: Żuromin
- Gmina: Lutocin

Psota [ˈpsɔta] is a settlement in the administrative district of Gmina Lutocin, within Żuromin County, Masovian Voivodeship, in east-central Poland.
