= Zielona =

Zielona may refer to the following places:

- Zielona, Lublin Voivodeship (east Poland)
- Zielona, Gmina Gródek in Podlaskie Voivodeship (northeast Poland)
- Zielona, Gmina Supraśl in Podlaskie Voivodeship (northeast Poland)
- Zielona, Bochnia County in Lesser Poland Voivodeship (south Poland)
- Zielona, Proszowice County in Lesser Poland Voivodeship (south Poland)
- Zielona, Ciechanów County in Masovian Voivodeship (east central Poland)
- Zielona, Przasnysz County in Masovian Voivodeship (east central Poland)
- Zielona, Żuromin County in Masovian Voivodeship (east central Poland)
- Zielona, Greater Poland Voivodeship (west central Poland)
- Zelena, a village in Nadvirna Raion in Ivano-Frankivsk Oblast in western Ukraine, which was part of Poland between the first and second world wars

other

- Zielona (genus), an insect genus in the tribe Dikraneurini
