= Pietrzak =

Pietrzak is a Polish patronymic surname, like Pietrzyk and Pietrzykowski, developed from the given name Piotr, when it was still Pietr, before it stabilized in its present form, Piotr, following the so-called Polish umlaut.

The oldest surviving record of the surname Pietrzak in Poland dates back to 1639, and, for example, in a very old parish book in Tropie, Lesser Poland Voivodeship, from 1668, when the surname of a Tropie resident was recorded as Bartłomiej Pietrzak. The largest number of Pietrzaks, nearly one third of all, live in central Poland, i.e. the Łódź and Masovian Voivodeships.

The suffix -ak, like -yk, indicates the paternal origin of the surname; it expressed a diminutive form with a positive emotional connotation; when added to the name Piotr, it likely meant Piotr's son. Archaic feminine forms are Pietrzakowa (by husband), Pietrzakówna (by father); they still can be used colloquially. It may be transliterated as: Petrzak, Petrzhak, Petshak, Петшак.

Notable people with this surname include the following:

- Anna Pietrzak, married name Bekasiewicz (born 1987), Polish national team basketball player
- Bogusław Pietrzak, Polish football manager
- Fiann Paul (born Paweł Pietrzak; 1980), Polish-Icelandic explorer
- Henryk Pietrzak (1914–1990), Polish fighter ace
- Jan Pietrzak (born 1937), Polish comedian
- Jerzy Pietrzak (born 1962), Polish sport shooter
- Jerzy Kazimierz Pietrzak (born 1942), Polish historian, senator
- Jim Pietrzak (1953–2018), American football player
- Konstantin Petrzhak (1907–1998), Soviet physicist of Polish origin
- Łucja Pietrzak (born 1995), Polish cyclist
- Michał Pietrzak (born 1989), Polish athlete
- Rafał Pietrzak (born 1992), Polish footballer
- Tadeusz Pietrzak (1926–2014), brigadier general of the Polish People's Army, Deputy Minister of Internal Affairs
- Vesna Pietrzak (born 2009), Polish rhythmic gymnast
- Włodzimierz Pietrzak (1913–1944), Polish poet

== See also ==
- Murders of Jan Pietrzak and Quiana Jenkins-Pietrzak
- Pietrzaki
