= Obórki =

Obórki may refer to the following places:

- Obórki, Kuyavian-Pomeranian Voivodeship (north-central Poland)
- Obórki, Piaseczno County in Masovian Voivodeship (east-central Poland)
- Obórki, Przasnysz County in Masovian Voivodeship (east-central Poland)
- Obórki, Żuromin County in Masovian Voivodeship (east-central Poland)
- Obórki, Opole Voivodeship (south-west Poland)
