= Pątki-Ośniak =

- Settlement
- Location within Poland
- Coordinates: 53°07′55″N 19°48′12″E
- Country: Poland
- Voivodeship: Masovian
- County: Żuromin
- Gmina: Lubowidz
- Time zone: UTC+1 (CET)
  - Summer (DST): UTC+2 (CEST)
- Postal code: 09-304
- Area code: +48 23

Pątki-Ośniak [ˈpɔntki ˈɔɕɲak] is a settlement in the administrative district of Gmina Lubowidz, within Żuromin County, Masovian Voivodeship, in east-central Poland.
