= Niedziałki, Masovian Voivodeship =

Niedziałki
- Village
- Location within Poland
- Coordinates: 53°7′56″N 20°6′43″E
- Country: Poland
- Voivodeship: Masovian
- County: Żuromin
- Gmina: Kuczbork-Osada
- Population: 20

Niedziałki [ɲɛˈd͡ʑau̯ki] is a village in the administrative district of Gmina Kuczbork-Osada, within Żuromin County, Masovian Voivodeship, in east-central Poland.
