= Bądzyn =

- Village
- Location within Poland
- Coordinates: 53°6′N 19°51′E
- Country: Poland
- Voivodeship: Masovian
- County: Żuromin
- Gmina: Lubowidz
- Time zone: UTC+1 (CET)
  - Summer (DST): UTC+2 (CEST)
- Vehicle registration: WZU

Bądzyn [ˈbɔnd͡zɨn] is a village in the administrative district of Gmina Lubowidz, within Żuromin County, Masovian Voivodeship, in north-central Poland.

Two Polish citizens were murdered by Nazi Germany in the village during World War II.
