= Obręb =

Obręb may refer to the following places:

- Obręb, Piaseczno County in Masovian Voivodeship (east-central Poland)
- Obręb, Pułtusk County in Masovian Voivodeship (east-central Poland)
- Obręb, Sierpc County in Masovian Voivodeship (east-central Poland)
- Obręb, Żuromin County in Masovian Voivodeship (east-central Poland)
