= Cierpigórz =

Cierpigórz may refer to the following places:

- Cierpigórz, Przasnysz County in Masovian Voivodeship (east-central Poland)
- Cierpigórz, Siedlce County in Masovian Voivodeship (east-central Poland)
- Cierpigórz, Żuromin County in Masovian Voivodeship (east-central Poland)
