= Kruszewo =

Kruszewo may refer to the following places:

- Kruszewo, Żuromin County in Masovian Voivodeship (east-central Poland)
- Kruszewo, Ostrołęka County in Masovian Voivodeship (east-central Poland)
- Kruszewo, Podlaskie Voivodeship (north-east Poland)
- Kruszewo, Greater Poland Voivodeship (west-central Poland)
- Kruszewo, Warmian-Masurian Voivodeship (north Poland)
