= Felcyn =

- Village
- Location within Poland
- Coordinates: 52°58′N 19°48′E
- Country: Poland
- Voivodeship: Masovian
- County: Żuromin
- Gmina: Lutocin

Felcyn [ˈfɛlt͡sɨn] is a village in the administrative district of Gmina Lutocin, within Żuromin County, Masovian Voivodeship, in east-central Poland.
