= Płock Land =

Polish political subdivision

- Land of Płock Voivodeship
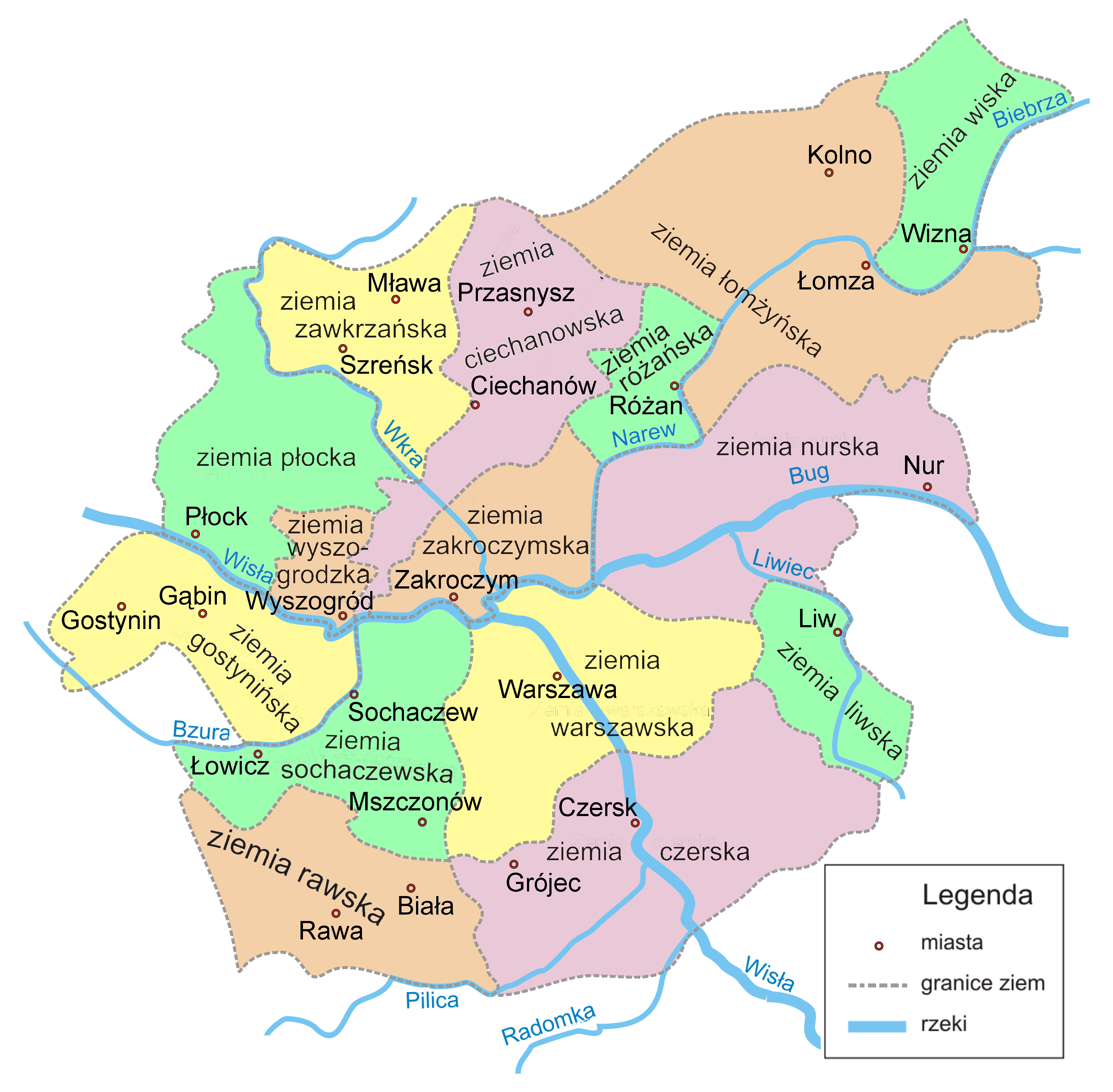
- Lands of Masovia from 13th to 18th centuries.
- Capital: Płock
- Area
  - 16th century: 3,983 km^{2} (1,538 sq mi)
  - Type: Land
- Contained within
  - Country: Polish–Lithuanian Commonwealth (1495–1793)
  - Member state: Crown of the Kingdom of Poland (1495–1793)
  - Province: Greater Poland Province (1495–1793)
  - Voivodeship: Płock Voivodeship (1495–1793)
- Political subdivisions: 4 counties (until 1530s) 5 counties (1530s–1793)
| Succeeded by |
| South Prussia |

Płock Land (Note: Polish: Ziemia płocka; Latin: Terra Plocensis) was a land (administrative division) of the Kingdom of Poland until 1495, and later, part of the Płock Voivodeship, Crown of the Kingdom of Poland, Polish–Lithuanian Commonwealth, from 1495 to 25 September 1793. The seat of its government was located in Płock.

== Subdivisions ==
The land was divided into five counties. They were:

- Płock County (seat: Płock);
- Bielsk County (seat: Bielsk);
- Raciąż County (seat: Raciąż);
- Płońsk County (seat: Płońsk);
- Sierpc County (seat: Sierpc).

Sierpc County was formed in the 1530s, from the portion of the Bielsk County.
