= Przyspa =

- Village
- Location within Poland
- Coordinates: 53°05′41″N 20°00′27″E
- Country: Poland
- Voivodeship: Masovian
- County: Żuromin
- Gmina: Kuczbork-Osada

Przyspa [ˈpʂɨspa] is a village in the administrative district of Gmina Kuczbork-Osada, within Żuromin County, Masovian Voivodeship, in east-central Poland.
