= Wiadrowo =

- Village
- Location within Poland
- Coordinates: 53°6′N 19°55′E
- Country: Poland
- Voivodeship: Masovian
- County: Żuromin
- Gmina: Żuromin

Wiadrowo [vjaˈdrɔvɔ] is a village in the administrative district of Gmina Żuromin, within Żuromin County, Masovian Voivodeship, in east-central Poland.
