= Biały Dwór, Masovian Voivodeship =

Biały Dwór
- Village
- Location within Poland
- Coordinates: 53°05′49″N 19°53′00″E
- Country: Poland
- Voivodeship: Masovian
- County: Żuromin
- Gmina: Lubowidz

Biały Dwór [ˈbjawɨ ˈdvur] is a village in the administrative district of Gmina Lubowidz, within Żuromin County, Masovian Voivodeship, in east-central Poland.
