= Płociczno =

Płociczno may refer to the following places:

- Płociczno, Masovian Voivodeship (east-central Poland)
- Płociczno, Podlaskie Voivodeship (north-east Poland)
- Płociczno, Pomeranian Voivodeship (north Poland)
- Płociczno, Warmian-Masurian Voivodeship (north Poland)
- Płociczno, West Pomeranian Voivodeship (north-west Poland)
- Płociczno-Tartak (north-east Poland)
