= Sinogóra-Rozwozinek =

- Settlement
- Location within Poland
- Coordinates: 53°05′16″N 19°45′51″E
- Country: Poland
- Voivodeship: Masovian
- County: Żuromin
- Gmina: Lubowidz

Sinogóra-Rozwozinek [ɕinɔˈɡura rɔzvɔˈʑinɛk] is a settlement in the administrative district of Gmina Lubowidz, within Żuromin County, Masovian Voivodeship, in east-central Poland.
