= Zatorowizna-Kresy =

- Settlement
- Location within Poland
- Coordinates: 53°03′26″N 19°40′13″E
- Country: Poland
- Voivodeship: Masovian
- County: Żuromin
- Gmina: Lubowidz

Zatorowizna-Kresy [zatɔrɔˈvizna ˈkrɛsɨ] is a settlement in the administrative district of Gmina Lubowidz, within Żuromin County, Masovian Voivodeship, in east-central Poland.
