= Gmina Lubowidz =

Gmina Lubowidz Lubowidz Commune
- Gmina
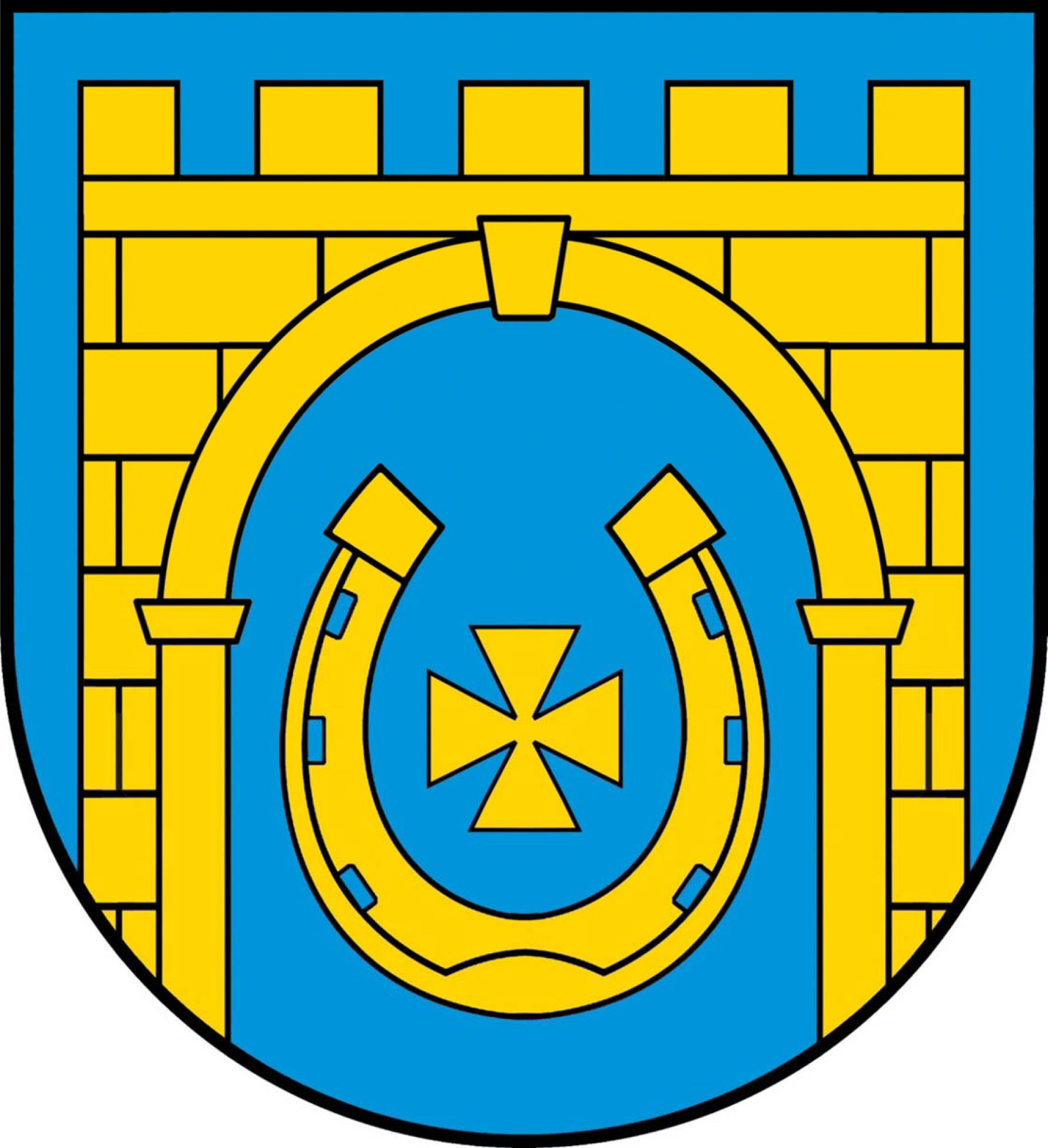
- Coat of arms
- Interactive map of Gmina Lubowidz
- Coordinates (Lubowidz): 53°7′7″N 19°50′39″E
- Country: Poland
- Voivodeship: Masovian
- County: Żuromin
- Seat: Lubowidz

Area
  - Total: 190.81 km^{2} (73.67 sq mi)

Population (2006)
  - Total: 7,339
  - Density: 38.46/km^{2} (99.62/sq mi)
- Time zone: UTC+1 (CET)
  - Summer (DST): UTC+2 (CEST)
- Vehicle registration: WZU
- Website: https://web.archive.org/web/20080127005138/http://www.lubowidz.com/

Gmina Lubowidz is an urban-rural gmina (administrative district) in Żuromin County, Masovian Voivodeship, in north-central Poland. Its seat is the town of Lubowidz, which lies approximately 7 kilometres (4 mi) north-west of Żuromin and 127 km (79 mi) north-west of Warsaw.

The gmina covers an area of 190.81 square kilometres (73.7 sq mi), and as of 2006 its total population is 7,339.

The gmina contains part of the protected area called Górzno-Lidzbark Landscape Park.

== Villages ==
Gmina Lubowidz contains the villages and settlements of Bądzyn, Biały Dwór, Cieszki, Dziwy, Galumin, Goliaty, Huta, Jasiony, Kaleje, Kipichy, Konopaty, Kozilas, Łazy, Lisiny, Lubowidz, Majdany-Leśniczówka, Mały Las, Mleczówka, Obórki, Osówka, Pątki, Pątki-Ośniak, Pątki-Pieńki, Płociczno, Przerodki, Przerodki-Kosmal, Purzyce, Ruda, Ruda Kurzyska, Rynowo, Sinogóra, Sinogóra-Psota, Sinogóra-Rozwozinek, Straszewy, Suchy Grunt, Syberia, Syberia-Wapniska, Sztok, Toruniak, Wronka, Wylazłowo, Żarnówka, Zatorowizna, Zatorowizna-Kresy, Zdrojki-Chojnowo, Zdrojki-Piegowo, Żelaźnia and Zieluń.

== Neighbouring gminas ==
Gmina Lubowidz is bordered by the gminas of Górzno, Kuczbork-Osada, Lidzbark, Lutocin, Skrwilno, Świedziebnia and Żuromin.
