= Lisiny, Masovian Voivodeship =

Lisiny
- Village
- Location within Poland
- Coordinates: 53°07′39″N 19°55′19″E
- Country: Poland
- Voivodeship: Masovian
- County: Żuromin
- Gmina: Lubowidz

Lisiny [liˈɕinɨ] is a village in the administrative district of Gmina Lubowidz, within Żuromin County, Masovian Voivodeship, in east-central Poland.
