= Galumin =

- Village
- Location within Poland
- Coordinates: 53°9′N 19°53′E
- Country: Poland
- Voivodeship: Masovian
- County: Żuromin
- Gmina: Lubowidz

Galumin [ɡaˈlumin] is a village in the administrative district of Gmina Lubowidz, within Żuromin County, Masovian Voivodeship, in east-central Poland.
