= Przeradz Mały =

- Village
- Location within Poland
- Coordinates: 53°2′N 19°48′E
- Country: Poland
- Voivodeship: Masovian
- County: Żuromin
- Gmina: Lutocin
- Time zone: UTC+1 (CET)
  - Summer (DST): UTC+2 (CEST)
- Vehicle registration: WZU

Przeradz Mały [ˈpʂɛrat͡s ˈmawɨ] is a village in the administrative district of Gmina Lutocin, within Żuromin County, Masovian Voivodeship, in north-central Poland.

Four Polish citizens were murdered by Nazi Germany in the village during World War II.
