= Dąbrowa, Żuromin County =

Dąbrowa
- Village
- Location within Poland
- Coordinates: 53°5′N 19°56′E
- Country: Poland
- Voivodeship: Masovian
- County: Żuromin
- Gmina: Żuromin

Dąbrowa [dɔmˈbrɔva] is a village in the administrative district of Gmina Żuromin, within Żuromin County, Masovian Voivodeship, in east-central Poland.
