= Huta, Żuromin County =

Huta
- Village
- Location within Poland
- Coordinates: 53°5′N 19°41′E
- Country: Poland
- Voivodeship: Masovian
- County: Żuromin
- Gmina: Lubowidz

Huta [ˈxuta] is a village in the administrative district of Gmina Lubowidz, within Żuromin County, Masovian Voivodeship, in east-central Poland.
