= Siemcichy =

- Village
- Location within Poland
- Coordinates: 53°3′N 19°49′E
- Country: Poland
- Voivodeship: Masovian
- County: Żuromin
- Gmina: Lutocin
- Website: http://www.siemcichy.prv.pl

Siemcichy [ɕɛmˈt͡ɕixɨ] is a village in the administrative district of Gmina Lutocin, within Żuromin County, Masovian Voivodeship, in east-central Poland.
