= Gmina Kuczbork-Osada =

Gmina Kuczbork-Osada Kuczbork-Osada Commune
- Gmina
- Coat of arms
- Interactive map of Gmina Kuczbork-Osada
- Coordinates (Kuczbork-Osada): 53°5′N 20°3′E
- Country: Poland
- Voivodeship: Masovian
- County: Żuromin
- Seat: Kuczbork-Osada

Area
  - Total: 121.64 km^{2} (46.97 sq mi)

Population (2006)
  - Total: 5,036
  - Density: 41.40/km^{2} (107.2/sq mi)
- Time zone: UTC+1 (CET)
  - Summer (DST): UTC+2 (CEST)
- Vehicle registration: WZU
- Website: http://ugkuczbork.home.pl/

Gmina Kuczbork-Osada is a rural gmina (administrative district) in Żuromin County, Masovian Voivodeship, in north-central Poland. Its seat is the village of Kuczbork-Osada, which lies approximately 9 kilometres (6 mi) north-east of Żuromin and 115 km (71 mi) north-west of Warsaw.

The gmina covers an area of 121.64 square kilometres (47.0 sq mi), and as of 2006 its total population is 5,036.

== Villages ==
Gmina Kuczbork-Osada contains the villages and settlements of Bagienice Duże, Bagienice Małe, Bagienice Nowe, Chodubka, Chojnowo, Gościszka, Kozielsk, Krzywki-Bratki, Kuczbork-Osada, Kuczbork-Wieś, Łążek, Mianowo, Nidzgora, Niedziałki, Nowa Wieś, Olszewko, Osowa, Przyspa, Sarnowo, Szronka, Wygoda and Zielona.

== Neighbouring gminas ==
Gmina Kuczbork-Osada is bordered by the gminas of Działdowo, Lipowiec Kościelny, Lubowidz, Płośnica, Szreńsk and Żuromin.
