= Pątki-Pieńki =

- Settlement
- Location within Poland
- Coordinates: 53°07′21″N 19°48′35″E
- Country: Poland
- Voivodeship: Masovian
- County: Żuromin
- Gmina: Lubowidz

Pątki-Pieńki [ˈpɔntki ˈpjɛɲki] is a settlement in the administrative district of Gmina Lubowidz, within Żuromin County, Masovian Voivodeship, in east-central Poland.
