= Elżbiecin, Żuromin County =

Elżbiecin
- Village
- Location within Poland
- Coordinates: 52°57′57″N 19°46′40″E
- Country: Poland
- Voivodeship: Masovian
- County: Żuromin
- Gmina: Lutocin

Elżbiecin [ɛlʐˈbjɛt͡ɕin] is a village in the administrative district of Gmina Lutocin, within Żuromin County, Masovian Voivodeship, in east-central Poland.
