= Kliczewo Małe =

- Village
- Location within Poland
- Coordinates: 53°3′N 20°1′E
- Country: Poland
- Voivodeship: Masovian
- County: Żuromin
- Gmina: Żuromin

Kliczewo Małe [kliˈt͡ʂɛvɔ ˈmawɛ] is a village in the administrative district of Gmina Żuromin, within Żuromin County, Masovian Voivodeship, in east-central Poland.
