= Łazy, Żuromin County =

Łazy
- Village
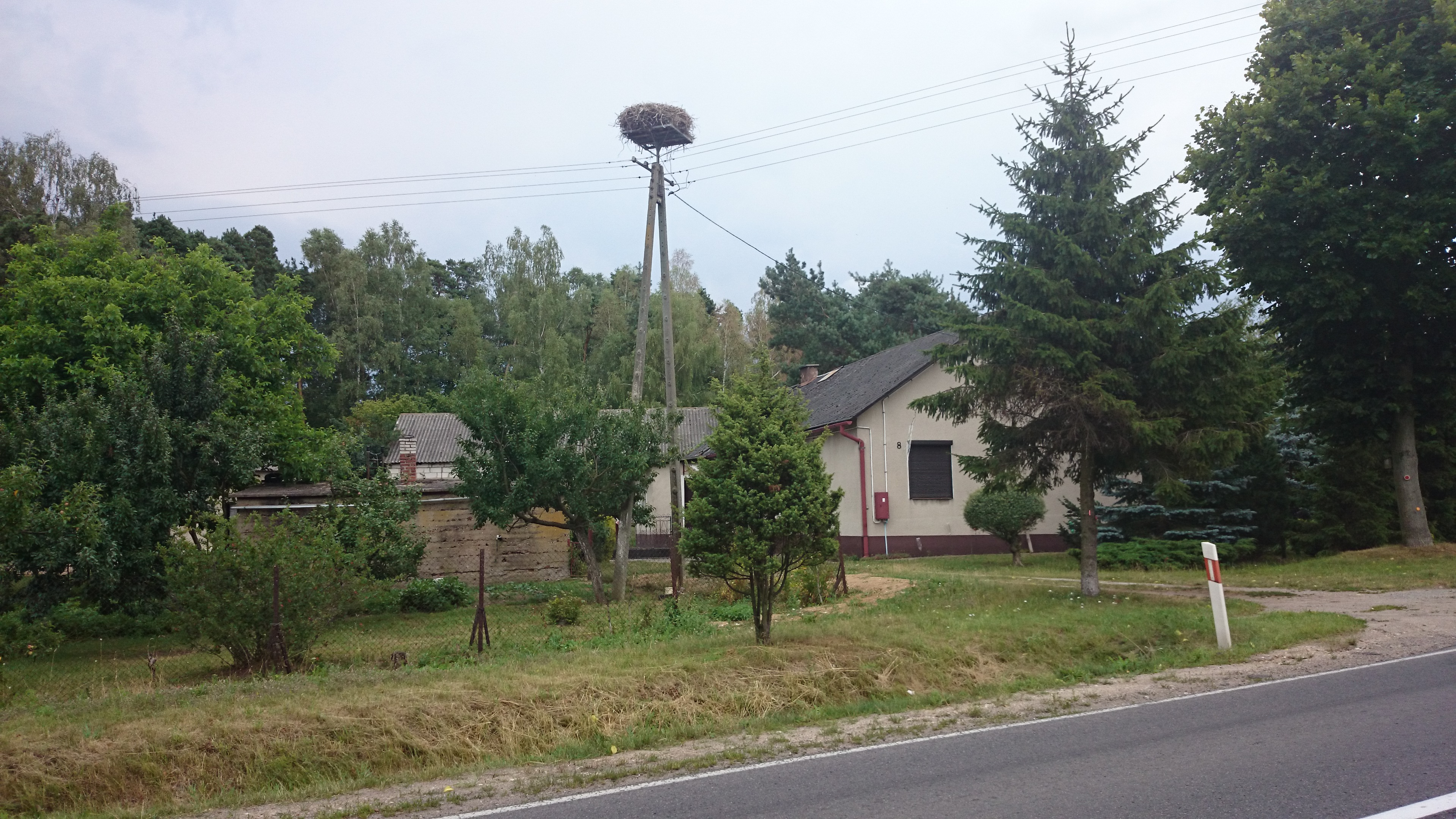

- Location within Poland
- Coordinates: 53°05′44″N 19°51′04″E
- Country: Poland
- Voivodeship: Masovian
- County: Żuromin
- Gmina: Lubowidz
- Time zone: UTC+1 (CET)
  - Summer (DST): UTC+2 (CEST)

Łazy [ˈwazɨ] is a village in the administrative district of Gmina Lubowidz, within Żuromin County, Masovian Voivodeship, in north-central Poland.
