= Mojnowo =

- Village
- Location within Poland
- Coordinates: 52°59′45″N 19°48′45″E
- Country: Poland
- Voivodeship: Masovian
- County: Żuromin
- Gmina: Lutocin

Mojnowo [mɔi̯ˈnɔvɔ] is a village in the administrative district of Gmina Lutocin, within Żuromin County, Masovian Voivodeship, in east-central Poland.
