= Suchy Grunt, Masovian Voivodeship =

Suchy Grunt
- Village
- Location within Poland
- Coordinates: 53°02′49″N 19°39′42″E
- Country: Poland
- Voivodeship: Masovian
- County: Żuromin
- Gmina: Lubowidz

Suchy Grunt [ˈsuxɨ ˈɡrunt] is a village in the administrative district of Gmina Lubowidz, within Żuromin County, Masovian Voivodeship, in east-central Poland.
