= Chromakowo =

- Village
- Location within Poland
- Coordinates: 53°2′N 19°50′E
- Country: Poland
- Voivodeship: Masovian
- County: Żuromin
- Gmina: Lutocin
- Website: http://chromakowo.2ap.pl

Chromakowo [xrɔmaˈkɔvɔ] is a village in the administrative district of Gmina Lutocin, within Żuromin County, Masovian Voivodeship, in east-central Poland.
