= Stare Nadratowo =

- Village
- Location within Poland
- Coordinates: 53°1′N 20°3′E
- Country: Poland
- Voivodeship: Masovian
- County: Żuromin
- Gmina: Żuromin
- Area: 0.5 km^{2} (0.19 sq mi)
  - Urban: 0.15 km^{2} (0.058 sq mi)
- Highest elevation: 121 m (397 ft)
- Lowest elevation: 119 m (390 ft)

Stare Nadratowo [ˈstarɛ nadraˈtɔvɔ] is a village in the administrative district of Gmina Żuromin, within Żuromin County, Masovian Voivodeship, in east-central Poland.
