= Obórki, Żuromin County =

Obórki
- Village
- Location within Poland
- Coordinates: 53°2′32″N 19°40′51″E
- Country: Poland
- Voivodeship: Masovian
- County: Żuromin
- Gmina: Lubowidz

Obórki [ɔˈburki] is a village in the administrative district of Gmina Lubowidz, within Żuromin County, Masovian Voivodeship, in east-central Poland.
