= Kuczbork-Osada =

- Village
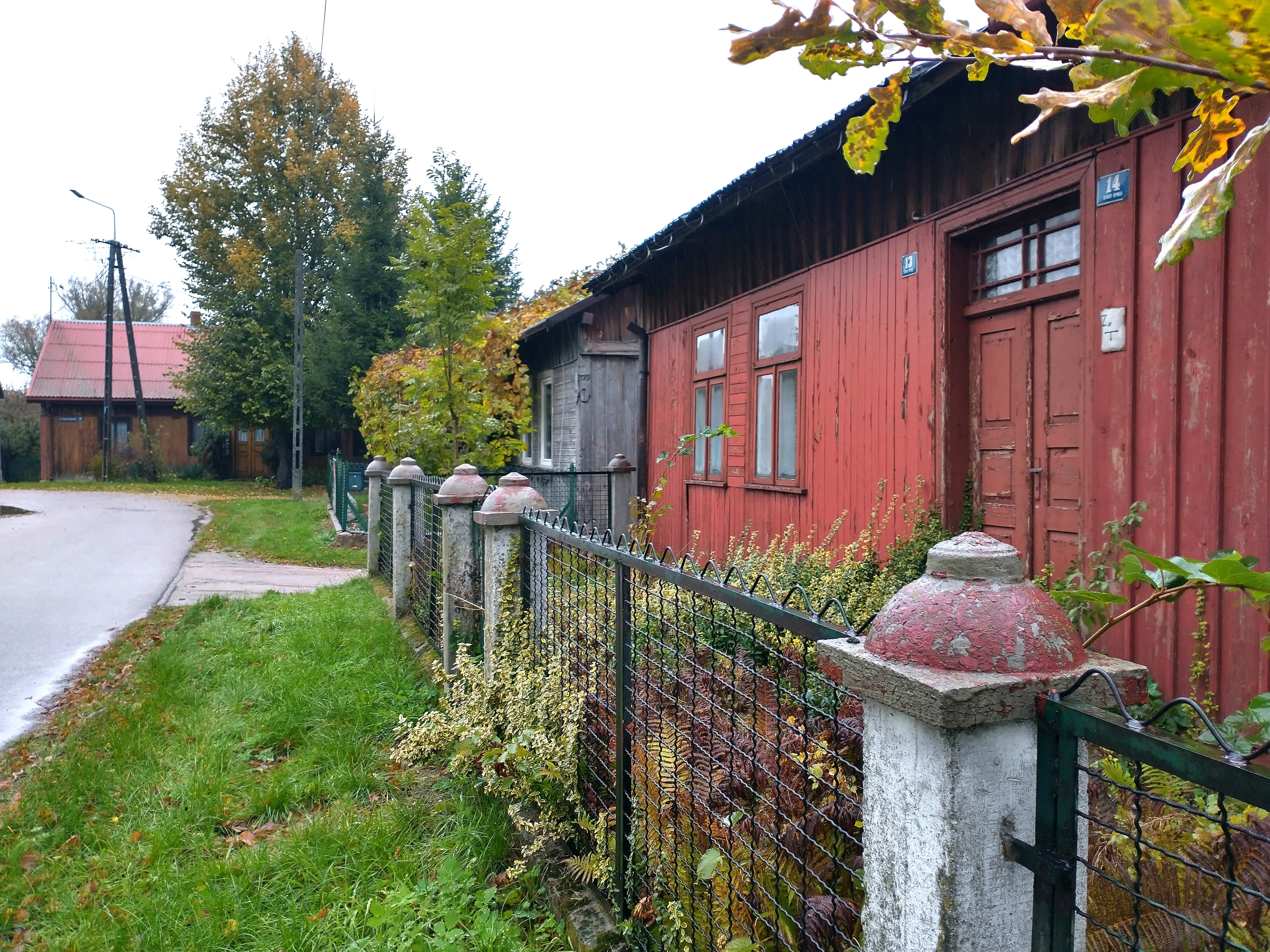

- Coat of arms

- Location within Poland
- Coordinates: 53°5′N 20°3′E
- Country: Poland
- Voivodeship: Masovian
- County: Żuromin
- Gmina: Kuczbork-Osada

Population
  - Total: 310
- Time zone: UTC+1 (CET)
  - Summer (DST): UTC+2 (CEST)
- Vehicle registration: WZU
- Website: http://ugkuczbork.webpark.pl/

Kuczbork-Osada [ˈkut͡ʂbɔrk ɔˈsada] is a village in Żuromin County, Masovian Voivodeship, in north-central Poland. It is the seat of the gmina (administrative district) called Gmina Kuczbork-Osada.

== History ==
It was a private town of Polish nobility, administratively located in the Szreńsk County in the Płock Voivodeship in the Greater Poland Province of the Kingdom of Poland.

Following the German-Soviet invasion of Poland, which started World War II in September 1939, it was occupied by Germany until 1945. The local Polish police chief was murdered by the Russians in the Katyn massacre in 1940. The Polish resistance was active in the area. On 18 September 1943, the Peasant Battalions attacked a German jail in Kuczbork.
