= Płociczno, Masovian Voivodeship =

Płociczno
- Village
- Location within Poland
- Coordinates: 53°7′N 19°42′E
- Country: Poland
- Voivodeship: Masovian
- County: Żuromin
- Gmina: Lubowidz

Płociczno [pwɔˈt͡ɕit͡ʂnɔ] is a village in the administrative district of Gmina Lubowidz, within Żuromin County, Masovian Voivodeship, in east-central Poland.
