= Niedzbórz =

- Village
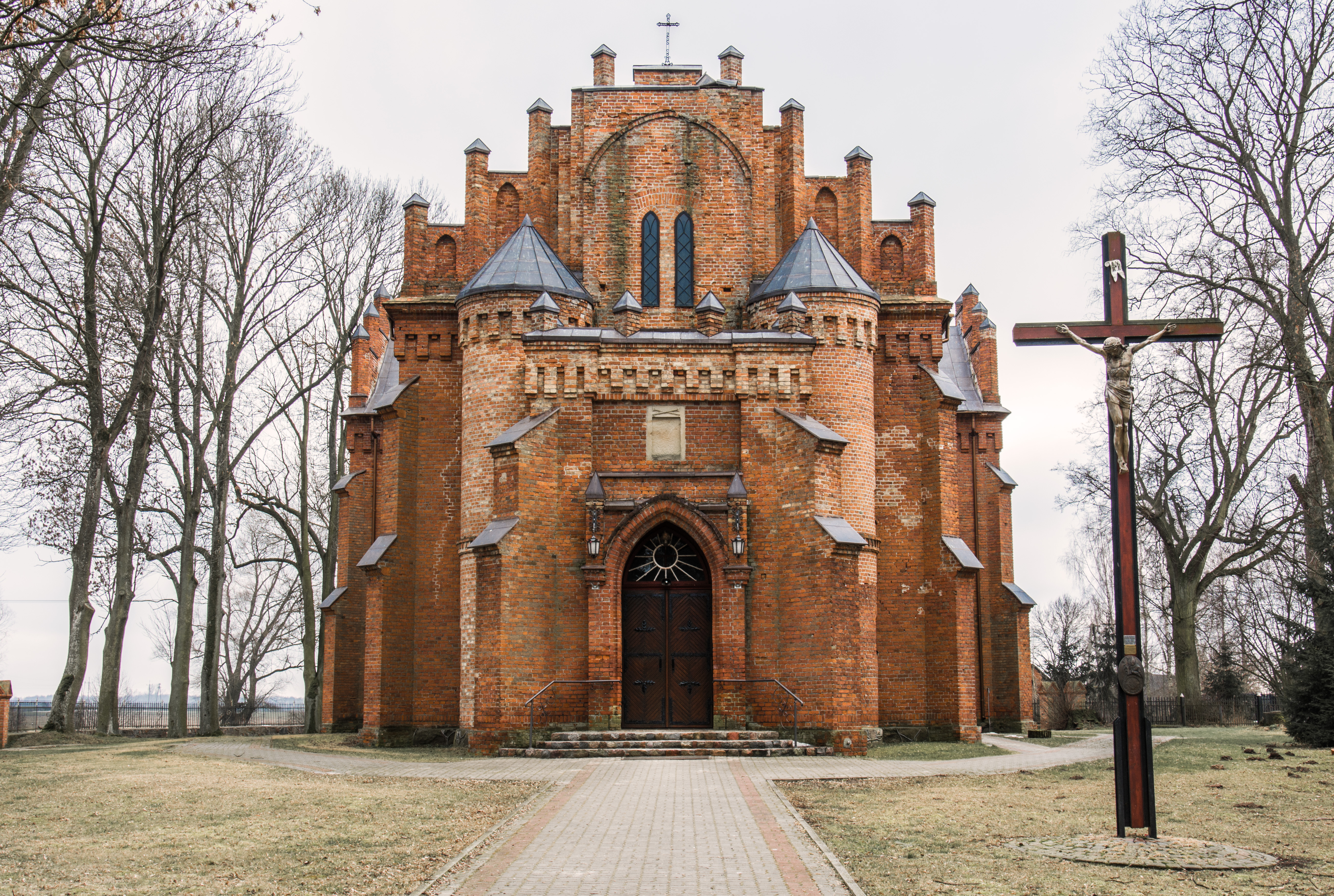
- Saint Nicholas church in Niedzbórz

- Location within Poland
- Coordinates: 52°56′7″N 20°22′0″E
- Country: Poland
- Voivodeship: Masovian
- County: Mława
- Gmina: Strzegowo

Population (2006)
  - Total: 460
- Time zone: UTC+1 (CET)
  - Summer (DST): UTC+2 (CEST)
- Postal Code: 06-458
- Area Code: (+48) 23
- Vehicle registration: WML

Niedzbórz [ˈɲɛd͡zbuʂ] is a village in the administrative district of Gmina Strzegowo, within Mława County, Masovian Voivodeship, in north-central Poland. It is located in the historic region of Zawkrze within the larger region of Mazovia.

== History ==
Niedzbórz was granted town rights in 1503, which were revoked before 1800. It was a county seat and private town of Polish nobility, administratively located in the Płock Voivodeship in the Greater Poland Province of the Kingdom of Poland.
