= Józef Sebastian Pelczar =

19th and 20th-century Polish Catholic priest and saint

Saint Józef Sebastian Pelczar
- Bishop of Przemyśl
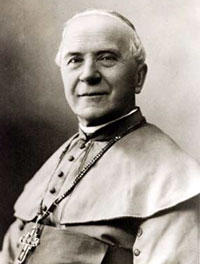
- c. 1920
- Church: Roman Catholic Church
- Diocese: Przemyśl
- See: Przemyśl
- Appointed: 17 December 1900
- Installed: 1901
- Term ended: 28 March 1924
- Predecessor: Łukasz Solecki
- Successor: Anatol Wincenty Nowak
- Previous posts: Auxiliary Bishop of Przemyśl (1899-1900); Titular Bishop of Miletopolis (1899-1900)

Orders
- Ordination: 17 July 1864
- Consecration: 19 March 1899 by Łukasz Solecki
- Rank: Bishop

Personal details
- Born: Józef Sebastian Pelczar; 17 January 1842 Korczyna, Podkarpackie, Congress Poland
- Died: 28 March 1924 (aged 82) Przemyśl, Podkarpackie, Second Polish Republic
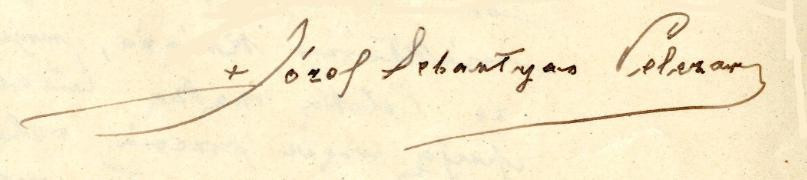
- Signature

Sainthood
- Feast day: 19 January (his baptismal day)
- Venerated in: Roman Catholic Church
- Beatified: 2 June 1991; Rzeszów, Poland by Pope John Paul II
- Canonized: 18 May 2003; Saint Peter's Square, Vatican City by Pope John Paul II
- Attributes: Bishop's attire; Sash; Pastoral staff
- Patronage: Sister Servants of the Most Sacred Heart of Jesus; Diocese of Przemyśl; Diocese of Rzeszów; Universities; Schools; Educators; Students

Józef Sebastian Pelczar (17 January 1842 – 28 March 1924) was a Polish Roman Catholic bishop and was also the co-founder of the Sister Servants of the Most Sacred Heart of Jesus which he had established in 1894 with Ludwika Szczęsna. He also served in several episcopal posts and served as the Bishop of Przemyśl.

Pope John Paul II - on his fourth visit to Poland - beatified Pelczar in 1991 and presided over the canonization at Saint Peter's Square in 2003.

== Life ==
Józef Sebastian Pelczar was born in Poland in 1842 to Adalbert and Marianna Mięsowicz. As a child he felt a strong calling to serve God and so once wrote in his journal: "Earthly ideals are fading away. I see the ideal of life in sacrifice, and the ideal of sacrifice in priesthood".

Pelczar studied in Rzeszów and then commenced his studies for the priesthood in Przemyśl in 1860. At the age of 16 he became a member of the Saint Vincent de Paul Society and of the organization known as Popular Education. After the completion of his studies, he was ordained as a priest on 17 July 1864. He was assigned to be a parish priest at Sambor. He was later transferred to Rome in 1866 for further studies and he studied at the Institute of Saint Apollinaris and at the Collegium Romanum. He gained a doctorate in both theological studies and in canon law. He also served as a professor from 1869 to 1877 and served in that role in both Przemyśl and Krakow from 1882 to 1883.

Pelczar established several libraries and he delivered free lectures and published countless books. He would write on historical topics as well as on canon law. He started a school for those who were servants. He founded the Fraternity of Our Lady, Queen of the Polish Crown in 1891 with the objective of caring for the poor and for orphans as well as for the sick and those who had no job. While in Krakow in 1893 he met Ludwika Szczęsna and the two established the Sister Servants of the Most Sacred Heart of Jesus on 15 April 1894 with the aim of working with women.

Pope Leo XIII appointed Pelczar as the Bishop of Przemyśl on 17 December 1900 and he was installed in 1901. He made frequent visits to all parishes within the diocese and supported all religious orders. He also conducted three episcopal meetings to discuss diocesan issues and worked to reform seminaries to promote better education and greater access to resources for them. In addition to this, he also built and restored churches, established nurseries, kitchens, homeless shelters and schools. He ensured that the implementation of the social doctrine described in the writings of Leo XIII — such as the papal encyclical Rerum Novarum – was a top priority.

Pelczar also served as one of the co-consecrators at the consecration of Achille Ratti — the future Pope Pius XI on 28 October 1919.

Pelczar died on 28 March 1924 with a strong reputation for holiness and was hailed as a shepherd who paid close attention to pastoral issues. It is said that he died in the odour of sanctity.

== Canonization ==
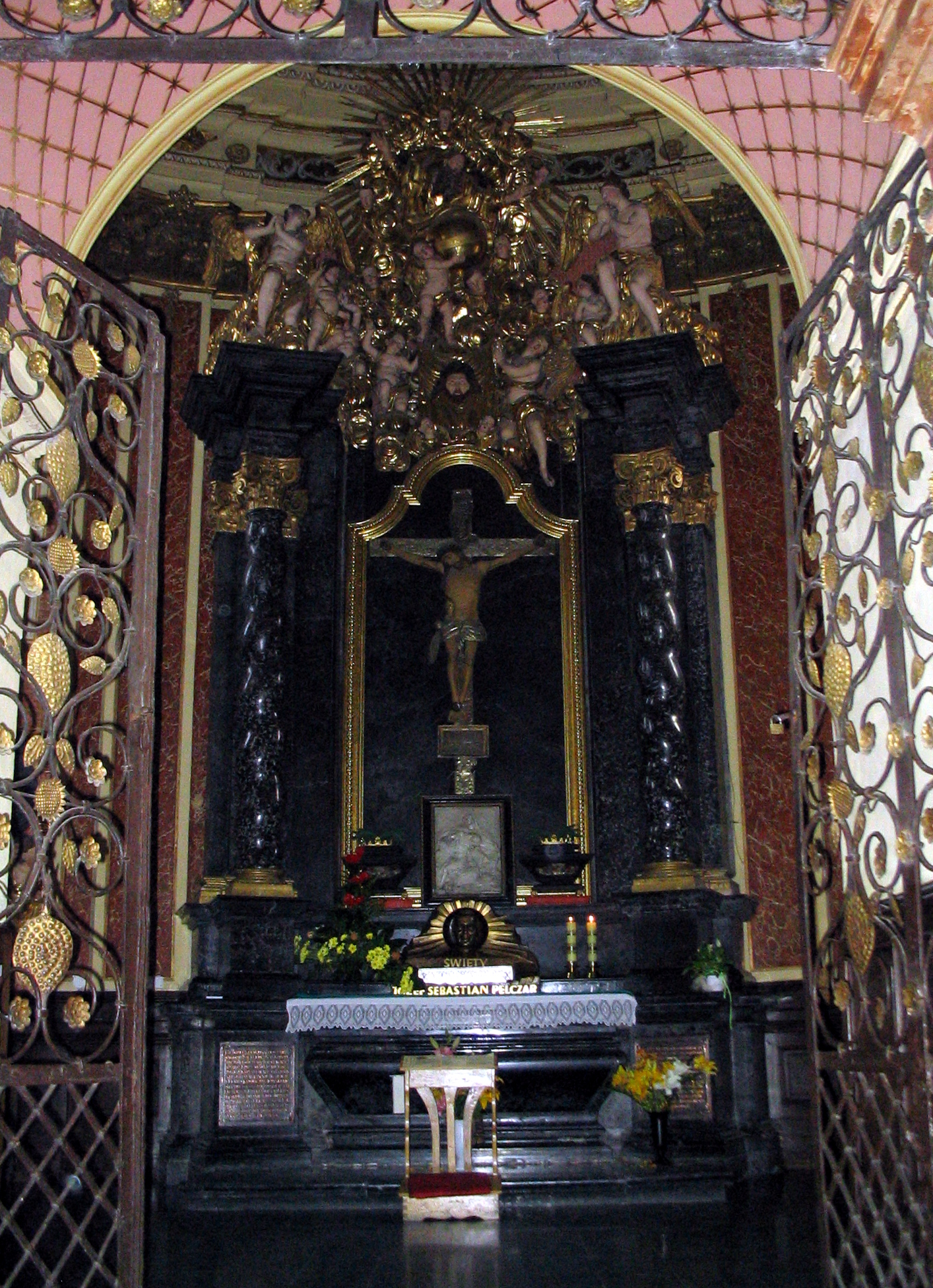
Tomb of St. Józef Sebastian Pelczar.

The sainthood process was introduced on a formal level on 25 January 1983 despite the fact that the local process had opened and the positio had been submitted for evaluation. The local process had spanned from 26 March 1954 until 1957 which granted Pelczar16 the posthumous title of Servant of God. The positio — documentation and a biography — was submitted to the Congregation for the Causes of Saints in 1982.

Pope John Paul II approved that Pelczar had lived a life of heroic virtue and declared him to be Venerable on 18 February 1989.

The miracle that was required for Pelczar's beatification was investigated and was ratified on 23 June 1989. John Paul II approved the miracle on 10 July 1990 and beatified him on his visit to Poland on 2 June 1991. The pope also approved the second miracle required for canonization and presided over the canonization on 18 May 2003.
