= Lutocin =

- Village
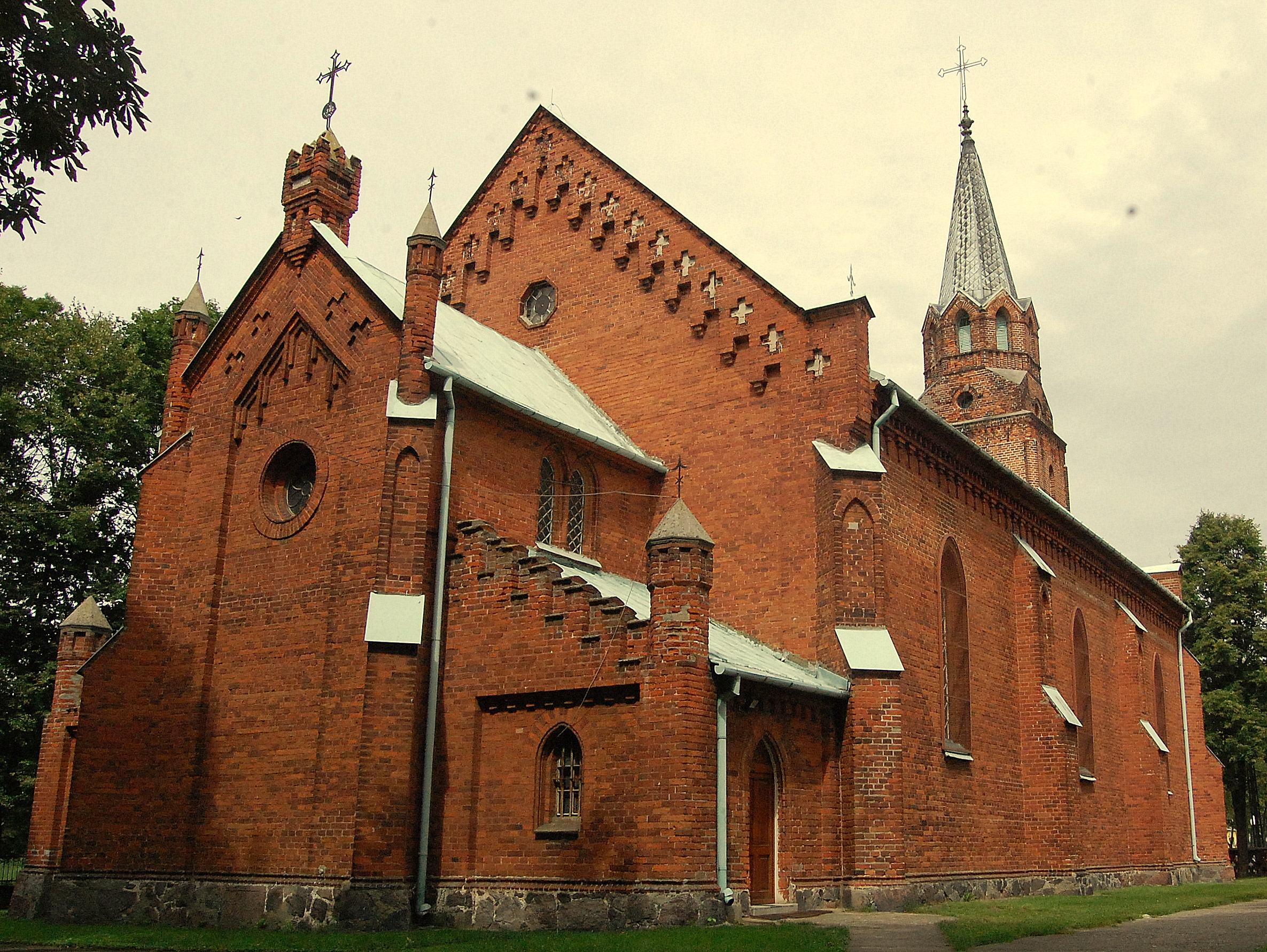
- Church of Saint Matthew

- Location within Poland
- Coordinates: 52°59′N 19°46′E
- Country: Poland
- Voivodeship: Masovian
- County: Żuromin
- Gmina: Lutocin

Population
  - Total: 1,000
- Website: http://www.lutocin.com.pl/

Lutocin [luˈtɔt͡ɕin] is a village in Żuromin County, Masovian Voivodeship, in east-central Poland. It is the seat of the gmina (administrative district) called Gmina Lutocin.
