= Dębówka, Żuromin County =

Dębówka
- Village
- Location within Poland
- Coordinates: 52°59′N 19°45′E
- Country: Poland
- Voivodeship: Masovian
- County: Żuromin
- Gmina: Lutocin

Dębówka [dɛmˈbufka] is a village in the administrative district of Gmina Lutocin, within Żuromin County, Masovian Voivodeship, in east-central Poland.
