= Bagienice Małe, Masovian Voivodeship =

Bagienice Małe
- Village
- Location within Poland
- Coordinates: 53°8′N 20°1′E
- Country: Poland
- Voivodeship: Masovian
- County: Żuromin
- Gmina: Kuczbork-Osada

Bagienice Małe (Polish pronunciation: [baɡʲɛˈɲitsɛ ˈmawɛ]) is a village in the administrative district of Gmina Kuczbork-Osada, within Żuromin County, Masovian Voivodeship, in east-central Poland.
