= Zielona, Żuromin County =

Zielona
- Village
- Location within Poland
- Coordinates: 53°5′N 19°58′E
- Country: Poland
- Voivodeship: Masovian
- County: Żuromin
- Gmina: Kuczbork-Osada
- Population: 1,900

Zielona [ʑɛˈlɔna] is a village in the administrative district of Gmina Kuczbork-Osada, within Żuromin County, Masovian Voivodeship, in east-central Poland.
