= Szczypiornia =

- Village
- Location within Poland
- Coordinates: 53°3′21″N 19°42′58″E
- Country: Poland
- Voivodeship: Masovian
- County: Żuromin
- Gmina: Lutocin
- Population: 30

Szczypiornia [ʂt͡ʂɨˈpjɔrɲa] is a village in the administrative district of Gmina Lutocin, within Żuromin County, Masovian Voivodeship, in east-central Poland.
