= Pietrzyk =

- Village
- Location within Poland
- Coordinates: 53°3′N 19°44′E
- Country: Poland
- Voivodeship: Masovian
- County: Żuromin
- Gmina: Lutocin

Pietrzyk [ˈpjɛtʂɨk] is a village in the administrative district of Gmina Lutocin, within Żuromin County, Masovian Voivodeship, in east-central Poland.

== See also ==
- Pietrzyk (surname)
