= Raciąż =

Town in Masovian Voivodeship, Poland

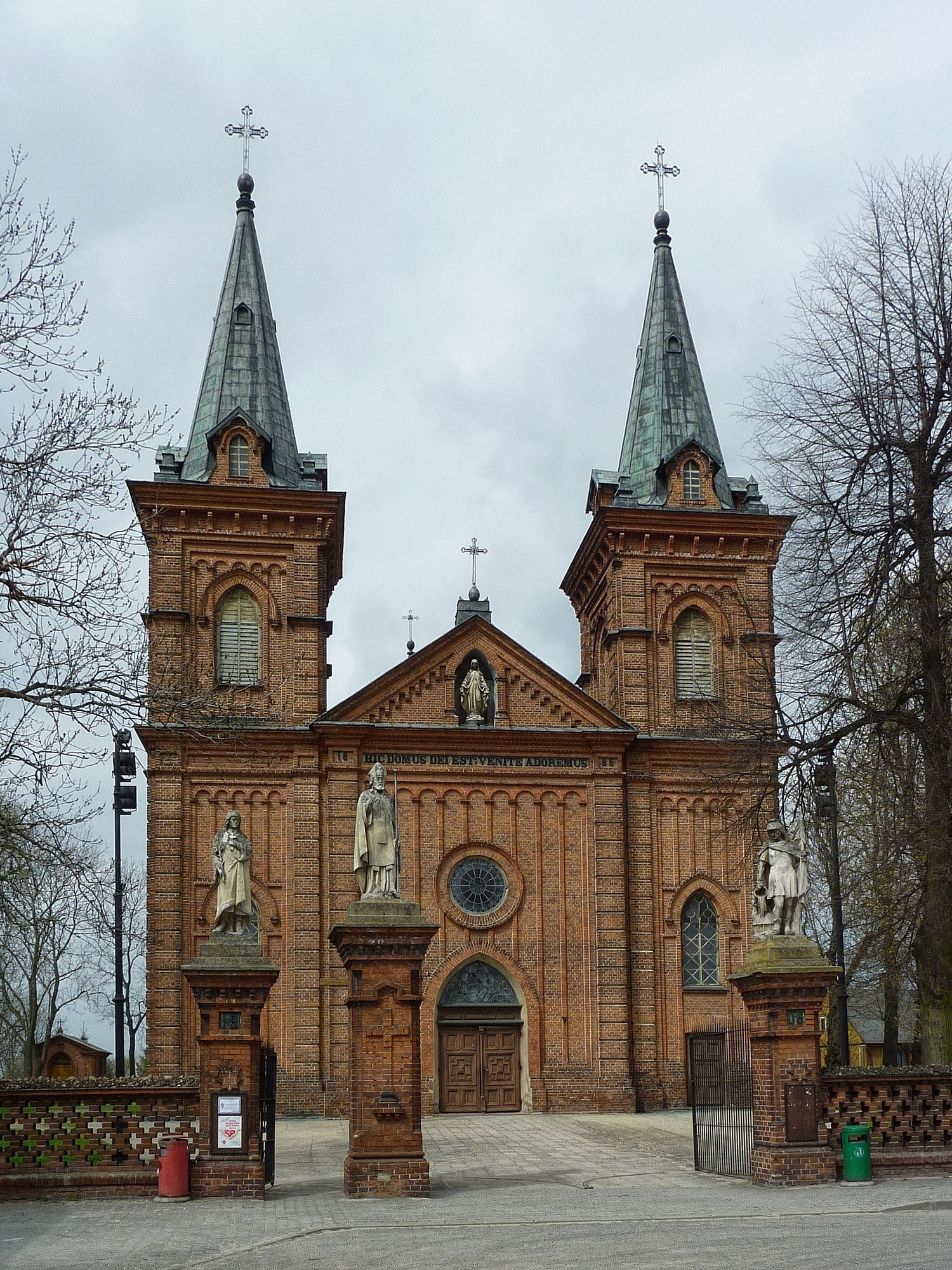
- Church of the Assumption

- Coat of arms

- Location within Poland
- Coordinates: 52°46′46″N 20°6′55″E
- Country: Poland
- Voivodeship: Masovian
- County: Płońsk
- Gmina: Raciąż (urban gmina)
- Established: 10th century
- Town rights: 1425

Government
  - Mayor: Mariusz Godlewski

Area
  - Total: 3.82 km^{2} (1.47 sq mi)

Population (2010)
  - Total: 4,642
  - Density: 1,220/km^{2} (3,150/sq mi)
- Time zone: UTC+1 (CET)
  - Summer (DST): UTC+2 (CEST)
- Postal code: 09-140
- Area code: +48 23
- Vehicle registration: WPN
- Website: http://www.miastoraciaz.pl/

Raciąż [ˈrat͡ɕɔ̃ʂ] is a town in Płońsk County, Masovian Voivodeship, in north-central Poland, with 4,642 inhabitants (2010). Its history dates to 10th century.

== History ==
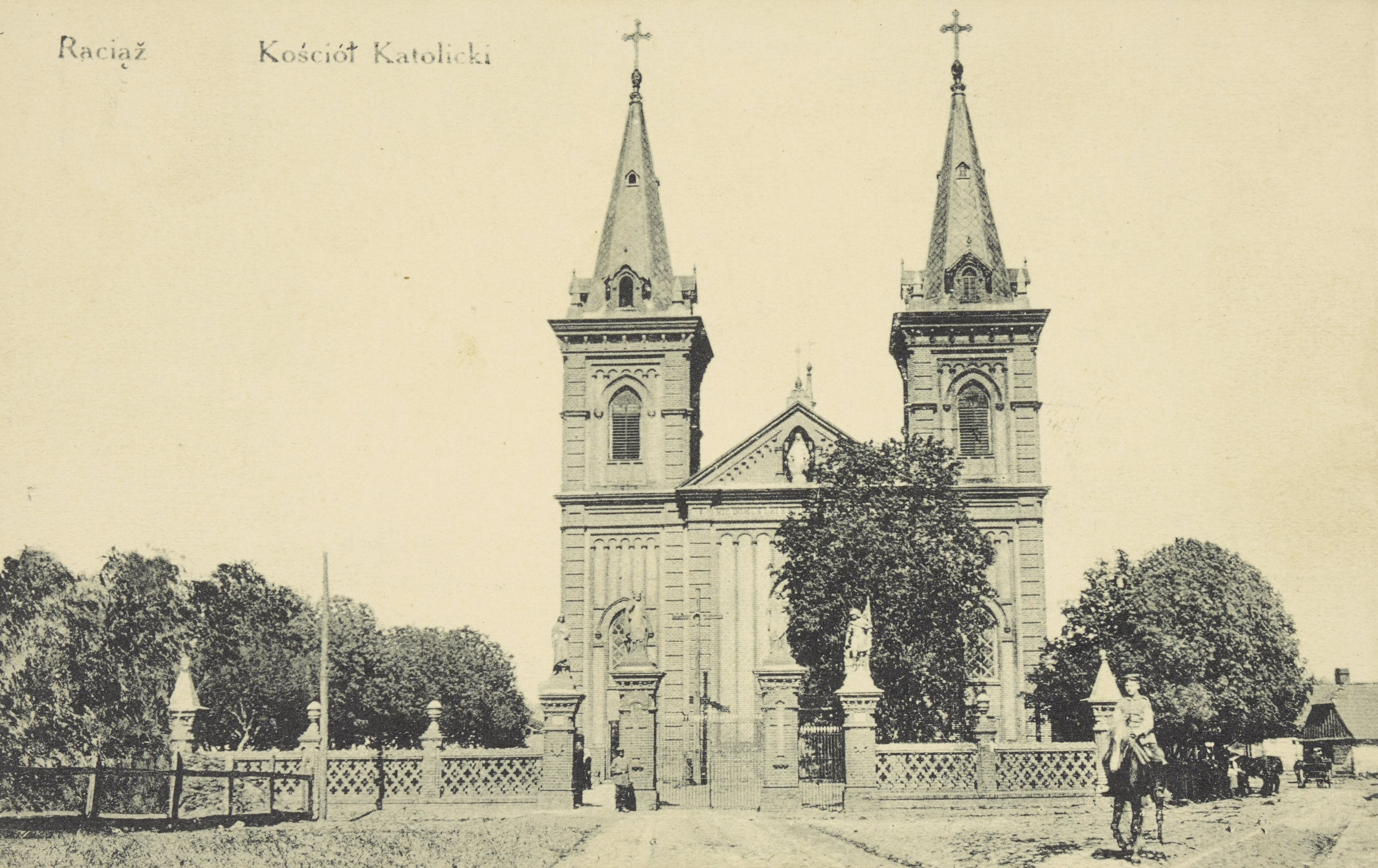
Church of the Assumption in the 1910s

Raciąż was granted town rights in 1425 by Siemowit IV, Duke of Masovia. It was located on a trade route connecting Toruń with Brześć. From 1495, it was a county seat within the Płock Voivodeship in the Greater Poland Province of the Kingdom of Poland. The 1st Polish National Cavalry Brigade was stationed in the town.

Since the 17th century Scottish and Jewish populations had lived in Raciąż. Between 1857 and 1931, the Jewish population of the town varied between 35% and 45%, which was typical of small shtetls in the region. At the beginning of World War II, there were about 1,700 Jews in Raciąż. The German invaders rounded up most of the Jews and deported them to Warsaw and other larger towns in 1939. Some were sent to forced labor camps too. Almost all of Raciąż' Jews were murdered during the war, but about ten young survivors returned to town after the war. Most were murdered one night by unknown people, either nationalists or thugs. After that, the remainder left.

After German occupation ended, the town was restored to Poland, although with a Soviet-installed communist regime, which stayed in power until the Fall of Communism in the 1980s. In 1946–1947, the Polish anti-communist resistance carried out four raids of the local communist police station.

== Demographics ==
Historical population

Year	Pop.	±%
1890	4,708	—
1897	4,656	−1.1%
1910	4,663	+0.2%
1921	4,513	−3.2%
1931	4,789	+6.1%

Year	Pop.	±%
1939	4,786	−0.1%
1950	3,504	−26.8%
1960	3,579	+2.1%
2010	4,642	+29.7%
