= Gmina Lutocin =

Gmina Lutocin Lutocin Commune
- Gmina
- Interactive map of Gmina Lutocin
- Coordinates (Lutocin): 52°59′N 19°46′E
- Country: Poland
- Voivodeship: Masovian
- County: Żuromin
- Seat: Lutocin

Area
  - Total: 126.03 km^{2} (48.66 sq mi)

Population (2006)
  - Total: 4,631
  - Density: 36.75/km^{2} (95.17/sq mi)
- Time zone: UTC+1 (CET)
  - Summer (DST): UTC+2 (CEST)
- Vehicle registration: WZU
- Website: http://www.lutocin.com.pl

Gmina Lutocin is a rural gmina (administrative district) in Żuromin County, Masovian Voivodeship, in north-central Poland. Its seat is the village of Lutocin, which lies approximately 13 kilometres (8 mi) south-west of Żuromin and 118 km (73 mi) north-west of Warsaw.

The gmina covers an area of 126.03 square kilometres (48.7 sq mi), and as of 2006 its total population is 4,631.

== Villages ==
Gmina Lutocin contains the villages and settlements of Boguszewiec, Chrapoń, Chromakowo, Dębówka, Elżbiecin, Felcyn, Głęboka, Jonne, Lutocin, Mojnowo, Nowy Przeradz, Obręb, Parlin, Pietrzyk, Przeradz Mały, Przeradz Wielki, Psota, Seroki, Siemcichy, Starcz, Swojęcin, Szczypiornia, Szoniec and Zimolza.

== Neighbouring gminas ==
Gmina Lutocin is bordered by the gminas of Bieżuń, Lubowidz, Rościszewo, Skrwilno and Żuromin.
