= Gmina Żuromin =

Gmina Żuromin Żuromin Commune
- Gmina
- Coat of arms
- Interactive map of Gmina Żuromin
- Coordinates (Żuromin): 53°4′N 19°54′E
- Country: Poland
- Voivodeship: Masovian
- County: Żuromin
- Seat: Żuromin

Area
  - Total: 132.44 km^{2} (51.14 sq mi)

Population (2006)
  - Total: 14,271
  - Density: 107.75/km^{2} (279.08/sq mi)
  - Urban: 8,647
  - Rural: 5,624
- Time zone: UTC+1 (CET)
  - Summer (DST): UTC+2 (CEST)
- Vehicle registration: WZU

Gmina Żuromin is an urban-rural gmina (administrative district) in Żuromin County, Masovian Voivodeship, in north-central Poland. Its seat is the town of Żuromin, which lies approximately 121 kilometres (75 mi) north-west of Warsaw.

The gmina covers an area of 132.44 square kilometres (51.1 sq mi), and as of 2006 its total population is 14,271 (out of which the population of Żuromin amounts to 8,647, and the population of the rural part of the gmina is 5,624).

== Villages ==
Apart from the town of Żuromin, Gmina Żuromin contains the villages and settlements of Będzymin, Brudnice, Chamsk, Cierpigórz, Dąbrowa, Dąbrowice, Dębsk, Franciszkowo, Kliczewo Duże, Kliczewo Małe, Kosewo, Kruszewo, Młudzyn, Nowe Nadratowo, Olszewo, Raczyny, Rozwozin, Rzężawy, Sadowo, Stare Nadratowo, Tadajówka, Wiadrowo and Wólka Kliczewska.

== Neighbouring gminas ==
Gmina Żuromin is bordered by the gminas of Bieżuń, Kuczbork-Osada, Lubowidz, Lutocin and Szreńsk.

== Bibliography ==
- Polish official population figures 2006
