= Lubowidz, Masovian Voivodeship =

Lubowidz
- Town
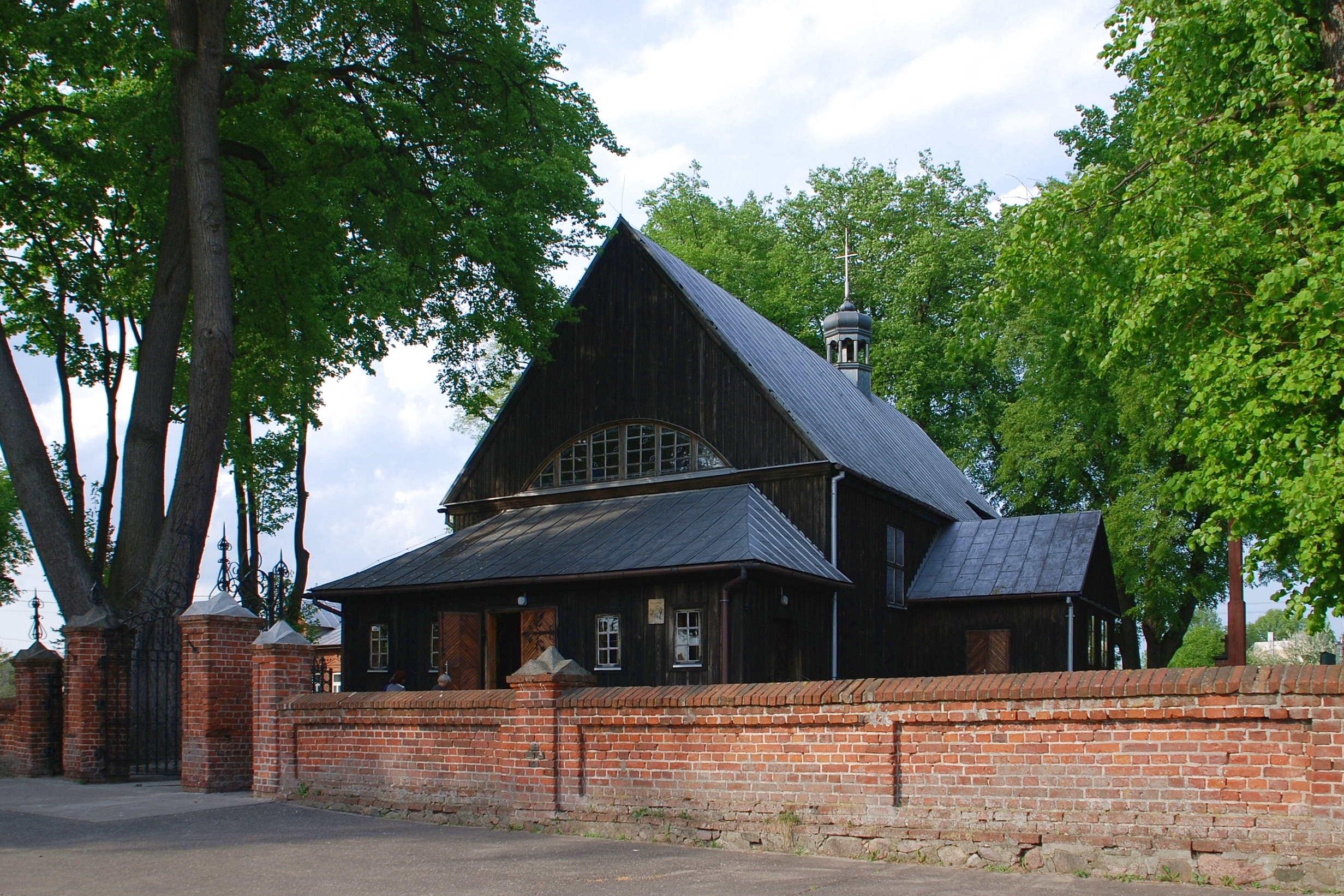
- Saint Andrew church in Lubowidz

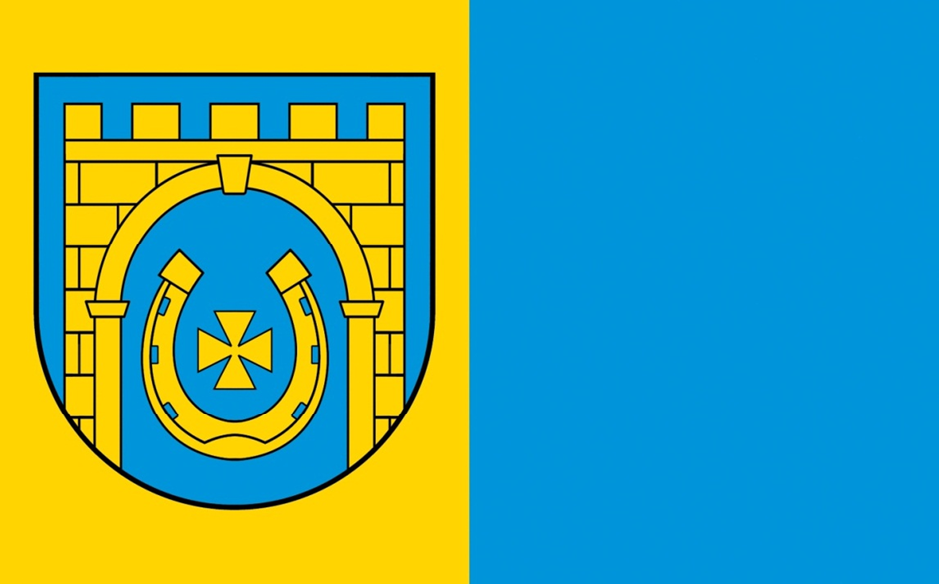
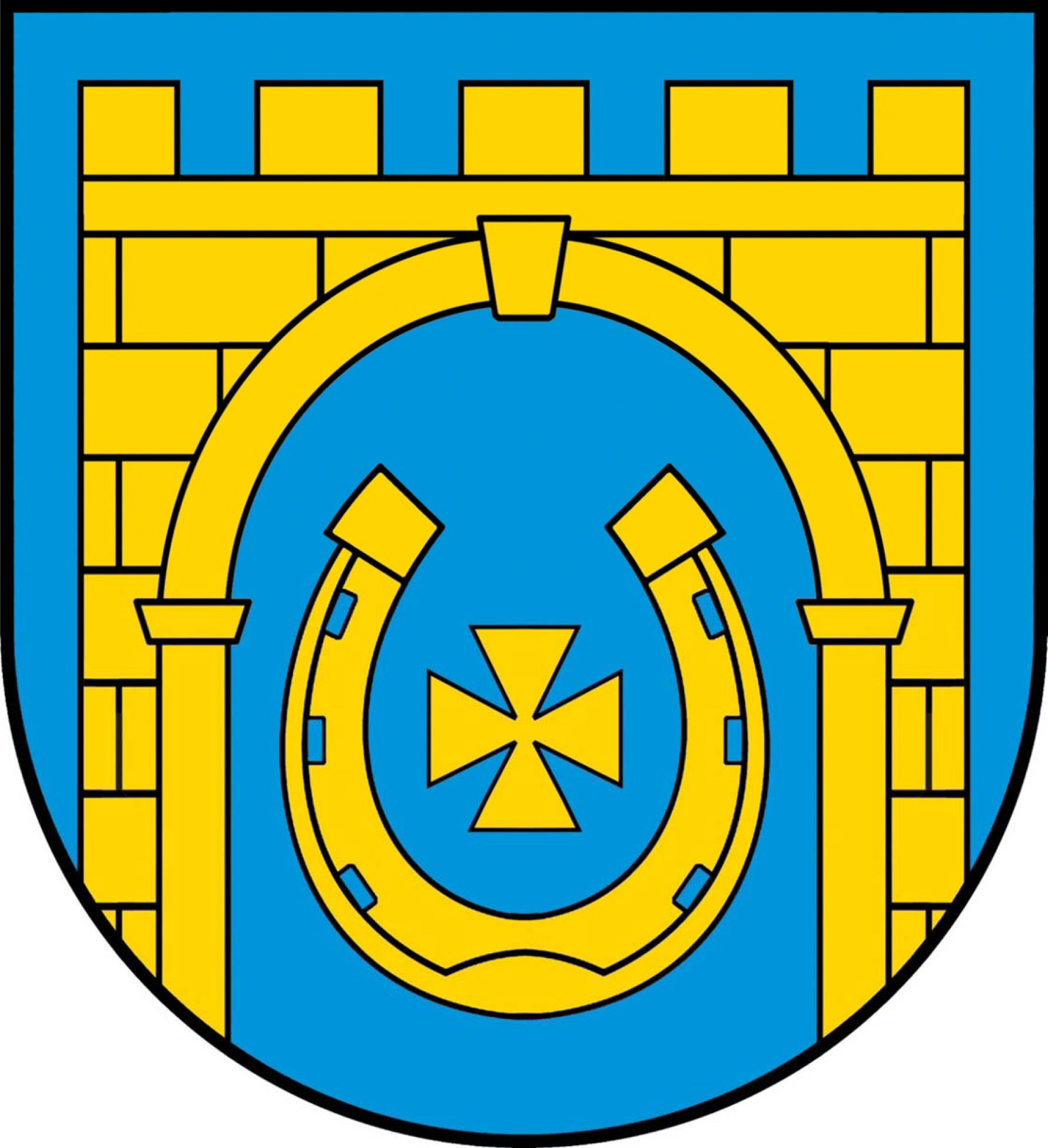
- Flag Coat of arms

- Location within Poland
- Coordinates: 53°7′7″N 19°50′39″E
- Country: Poland
- Voivodeship: Masovian
- County: Żuromin
- Gmina: Lubowidz
- First mentioned: 1345
- Town rights: 1531

Population
  - Total: 1,798
- Time zone: UTC+1 (CET)
  - Summer (DST): UTC+2 (CEST)
- Vehicle registration: WZU

Lubowidz [luˈbɔvit͡s] is a town in Żuromin County, Masovian Voivodeship, in north-central Poland. It is the seat of the gmina (administrative district) called Gmina Lubowidz.

The town has a population of 1,798.

== History ==
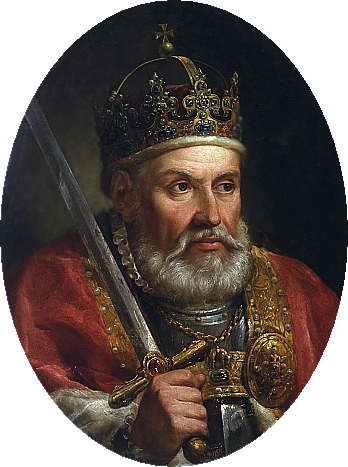
Polish King Sigismund I the Old vested Lubowidz with town rights in 1531

The settlement was first mentioned in the 14th century. It was granted town rights in 1531 by King Sigismund I the Old. It was a private town, administratively located in the Szreńsk County in the Płock Voivodeship in the Greater Poland Province of the Kingdom of Poland. It lost its town rights following a devastating Swedish occupation.

In 1921, it had a population of 1,092, entirely Polish by nationality and Catholic by confession.

During the German occupation of Poland (World War II), in 1941, the German gendarmerie carried out expulsions of Poles, who were deported to forced labour, while their houses and farms were handed over to German colonists as part of the Lebensraum policy.

In 2019, town rights were restored.
