= Płock Voivodeship (1495–1793) =

Former administrative division of the Kingdom of Poland

Coordinates: 52°33′00″N 19°42′00″E

Płock Voivodeship Województwo płockie Palatinatus Plocensis
- Voivodeship of Poland¹
- 1495–1793
- Coat of arms

- The Płock Voivodeship in the Polish–Lithuanian Commonwealth in 1635.
- Capital: Płock
- Area
- 3,591 km^{2} (1,386 sq mi)
- History
  - Established: 1495
  - Second partition: 25 September 1793
- Political subdivisions: counties: 8, including three counties of Zawkrze Land
Preceded by	Succeeded by
Duchy of Masovia / Duchy of Masovia	South Prussia
- Today part of: Poland
- ¹ Voivodeship of the Kingdom of Poland. The kingdom was part of the Polish–Lithuanian Commonwealth from 1569.

Płock Voivodeship (Polish: Województwo Płockie) was a unit of administrative division and local government in the Kingdom of Poland from 1495 until the partitions of Poland in 1795. Together with the Rawa Voivodeship and Masovian Voivodeship it formed the historical region of Mazovia, and with several other voivodeships it formed part of the Greater Poland Province.

Zygmunt Gloger in his monumental book Historical Geography of the Lands of Old Poland gives a detailed description of Płock Voivodeship:

"After childless death of Janusz II, Duke of Łomża, Ciechanów, Wizna and Płock, which took place on February 16, 1495, the Duchy of Płock, except for the Land of Wyszogród, was incorporated into the Kingdom of Poland, and turned into a voivodeship (...) In the 16th century, it had the area of 701 square miles, divided into eight small counties: those of Płock, Bielsk, Raciąż, Sierpc, Płońsk, Szrensk, Niedzborz, and Mława. The three last counties, located between the Wkra river and Prussian border, made the so-called Zawkrze Land (...) The voivodeship had 67 Roman-Catholic parishes, 63 towns and 1,115 villages. Most densely populated was Bielsk County (...)

Local sejmiks for the voivodeship took place at Raciąż, the town located in the middle of the province. During the reign of King Stanisław II Augustus, the sejmiks were moved to Płock. The voivodeship had five senators: the Bishop of Płock, the Voivode of Płock, the Castellan of Płock, and Castellans of Raciaz and Sierpc. Land courts were located in Płock, Bielsk and Sierpc (since 1726, also in Mława)".

== Municipal government ==
Voivodeship Governor (Wojewoda) seat:

- Płock

Regional council (sejmik) seats:

- Raciaz, later Płock

== Administrative division ==
- Płock County,
- Bielsk County,
- Raciąż County,
- Sierpc County,
- Płońsk County,

Zawkrze Land, divided into the following counties

- Szreńsk County,
- Niedzbórz County,
- Mława County.

== Cities and towns ==
=== Bielsk County ===
- Bielsk
- Drobin

=== Mława County ===
- Mława

=== Niedzbórz County ===
- Niedzbórz

=== Płock County ===
- Płock

=== Płońsk County ===
- Płońsk

=== Raciąż County ===
- Raciąż
- Radzanów

=== Sierpc County ===
- Bieżuń
- Sierpc

=== Szreńsk County ===
- Karniszyn
- Kuczbork
- Lubowidz
- Poniatowo
- Stare Dłutowo
- Szreńsk
- Żuromin

== Voivodes ==
- Krzywosąd (1299)
- Ziemak (1303)
- Stanisław Krasiński (since 1600)
- Jan Stanisław Karnkowski (1617–1647)
- Jan Kazimierz Krasiński (since 1650)
- Jan Dobrogost Krasiński (since 1688)

== Sources ==
- Płock Voivodeship, description by Zygmunt Gloger
