= Pietrzykowski =

Pietrzykowski (feminine: Pietrzykowska, plural: Pietrzykowscy) is a Polish surname, and may refer to:

- David Pietrzykowski, Center Rock CEO
- Jennie Marie Pietrzykowski, mother of Janice Dickinson
- Tad Pietrzykowski, Cyclone! comic artist
- Tadeusz Pietrzykowski (1917–1991), Polish boxer, Polish Armed Forces soldier, and a prisoner at the Auschwitz-Birkenau and Neuengamme concentration camps
- Tomacz Pietrzykowski, Dean of the School of Computer Science at Acadia University
- Zbigniew Pietrzykowski (1934–2014), Polish boxer, lost to Muhammad Ali in 1960 Olympic final
