= Żuromin =

Town in Masovian Voivodeship, Poland

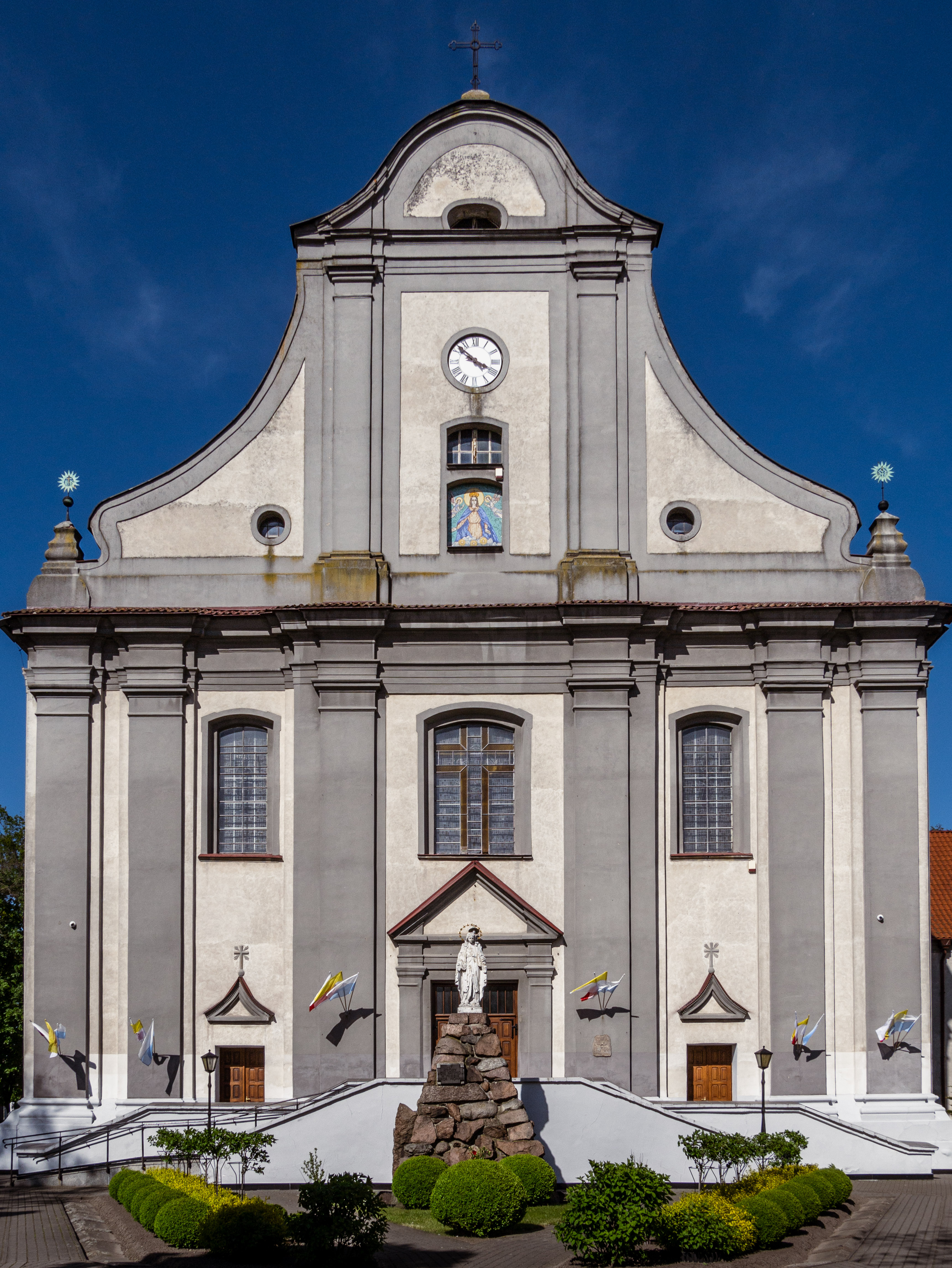
- Baroque Holy Trinity church in Żuromin

- Coat of arms

- Location within Poland
- Coordinates: 53°4′N 19°54′E
- Country: Poland
- Voivodeship: Masovian
- County: Żuromin
- Gmina: Żuromin
- Established: before 1293
- Town rights: 1767

Government
  - Mayor: Aneta Goliat

Area
  - Total: 11.11 km^{2} (4.29 sq mi)

Population (2016)
  - Total: 8,987
  - Density: 808.9/km^{2} (2,095/sq mi)
- Time zone: UTC+1 (CET)
  - Summer (DST): UTC+2 (CEST)
- Postal code: 09-300
- Area code: +48 023
- Car plates: WZU
- Website: http://zuromin.info/

Żuromin [ʐuˈrɔmin] is a town in north-central Poland, in Masovian Voivodeship, about 120 kilometres (75 miles) northwest of Warsaw. It is the capital of Żuromin County.

== History ==
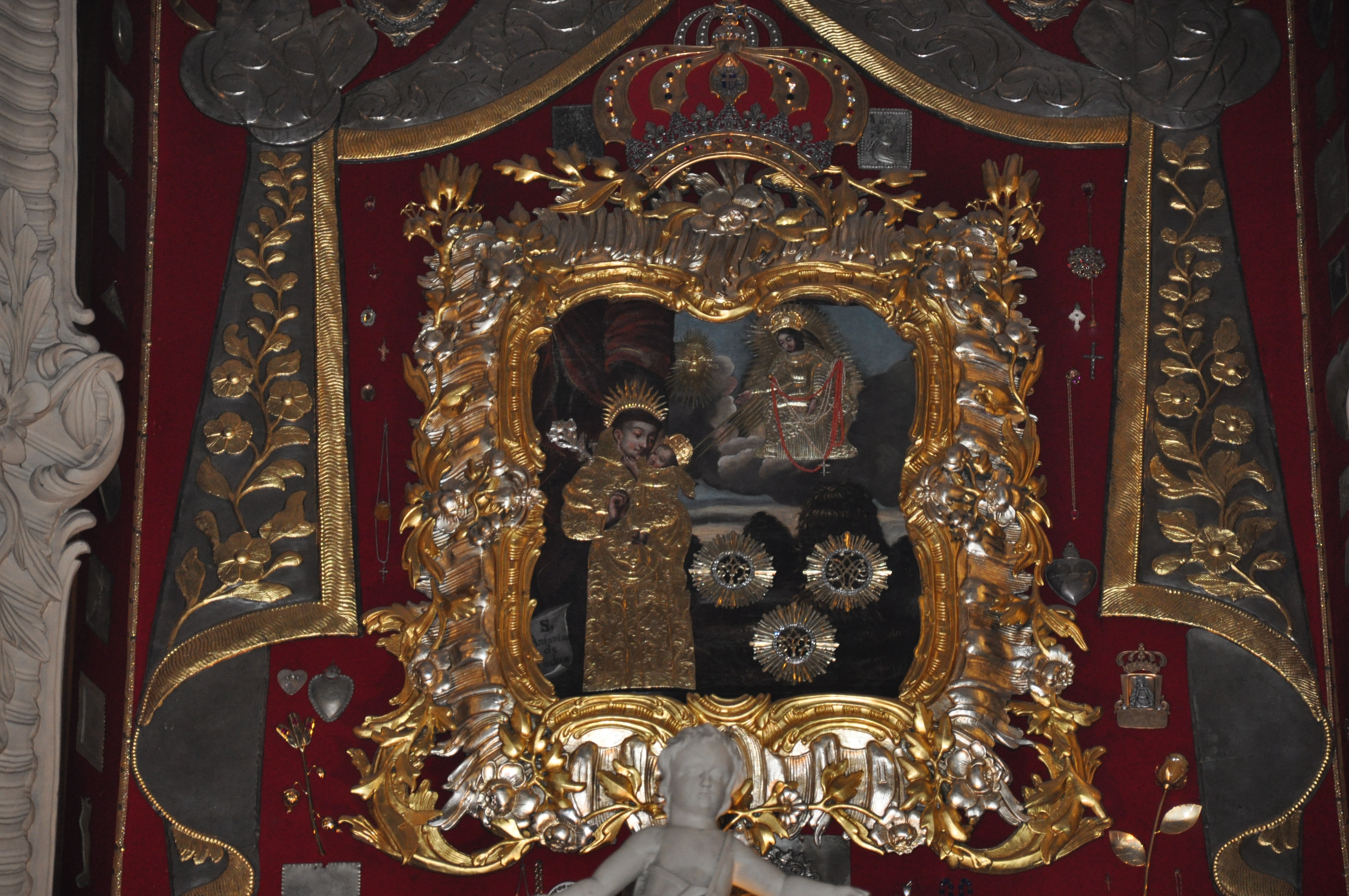
Our Lady of Żuromin icon in the Holy Trinity church

Żuromin was founded within medieval Piast-ruled Poland. It was mentioned in documents in the 13th century. It was a private village and afterwards a private town of Polish nobility, including the Działyński and Zamoyski families, administratively located within the Płock Voivodeship in the Greater Poland Province. The Jesuits came to Żuromin in 1715 and founded a school. Żuromin was developed into a town by Chancellor of Poland Andrzej Zamoyski and vested with town rights in 1767 by King Stanisław August Poniatowski.

The town was annexed by Prussia in the Third Partition of Poland in 1795. In 1807 it was regained by Poles and included within the short-lived Duchy of Warsaw, and after its dissolution it became part of so-called Congress Poland in the Russian Partition of Poland. During the January Uprising, on February 8, 1863, a battle between Polish insurgents and Russian troops was fought near Żuromin. In 1918 it became again part of independent Poland, as the country regained sovereignty after World War I. During the Polish–Soviet War, in August 1920, Polish troops led by Gustaw Orlicz-Dreszer encountered Soviet troops near the town, however, there was no battle as the Soviets retreated.

During World War II, the town was occupied by Germany from 1939 to 1945. In late 1939, local Polish priest Stanisław Malinowski was deported to the Soldau concentration camp and then murdered there. Local Polish teachers and a school principal were among Polish teachers and principals murdered in the Mauthausen concentration camp, and local disabled people were murdered by the Germans in a massacre carried out in February 1940 in the nearby village of Ościsłowo. Local Poles were also subjected to expulsions.

== Pilgrimage ==
The local Baroque Holy Trinity church contains the venerated icon of Our Lady of Żuromin, making Żuromin a regional Christian pilgrimage destination.

== Sports ==
The local football team is Wkra Żuromin. It competes in the lower leagues.

== Notable people ==
- Łukasz Teodorczyk (born 1991), Polish footballer
