= Żuromin County =

Żuromin County Powiat żuromiński
- County
- Flag Coat of arms

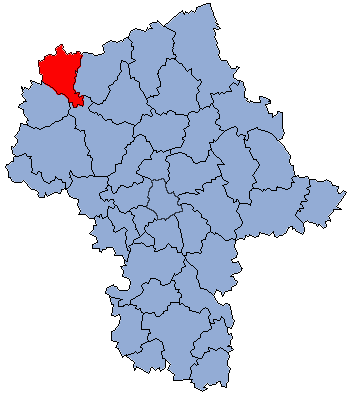
- Location within the voivodeship

- Division into gminas
- Coordinates (Żuromin): 53°4′N 19°54′E
- Country: Poland
- Voivodeship: Masovian
- Seat: Żuromin
- Gminas: Total 6: Gmina Bieżuń; Gmina Kuczbork-Osada; Gmina Lubowidz; Gmina Lutocin; Gmina Siemiątkowo; Gmina Żuromin

Area
  - Total: 805.01 km^{2} (310.82 sq mi)

Population (2019)
  - Total: 38,688
  - Density: 48.059/km^{2} (124.47/sq mi)
  - Urban: 12,397
  - Rural: 26,291
- Time zone: UTC+1 (CET)
  - Summer (DST): UTC+2 (CEST)
- Vehicle registration: WZU
- Website: www.zuromin-powiat.pl

Żuromin County (Polish: powiat żuromiński) is a unit of territorial administration and local government (powiat) in Masovian Voivodeship, north-central Poland. It came into being on January 1, 1999, as a result of the Polish local government reforms passed in 1998. Its administrative seat and largest town is Żuromin, which lies 121 kilometres (75 mi) north-west of Warsaw. Other towns in the county are Bieżuń, lying 13 km (8 mi) south of Żuromin and Lubowidz, lying 9 km (6 mi) north-west of Żuromin.

The county covers an area of 805.01 square kilometres (310.8 sq mi). As of 2019 its total population is 38,688, out of which the population of Żuromin is 8,867, that of Bieżuń is 1,846, that of Lubowidz is 1,684, and the rural population is 26,291.

== Neighbouring counties ==
Żuromin County is bordered by Działdowo County to the north-east, Mława County to the east, Płońsk County to the south-east, Sierpc County to the south-west, and Rypin County and Brodnica County to the west.

== Administrative divisions ==
The county is subdivided into six gminas (three urban-rural and three rural). These are listed in the following table, in descending order of population.

Gmina	Type	Area (km^{2})	Population (2016)	Seat
Gmina Żuromin	urban-rural	132.4	14,395	Żuromin
Gmina Lubowidz	urban-rural	190.8	6,866	Lubowidz
Gmina Bieżuń	urban-rural	122.0	4,977	Bieżuń
Gmina Kuczbork-Osada	rural	121.6	4,724	Kuczbork-Osada
Gmina Lutocin	rural	126.0	4,256	Lutocin
Gmina Siemiątkowo	rural	112.1	3,470	Siemiątkowo
