= Slowik (surname) =

Slowik or Słowik (Polish pronunciation: [ˈswɔvik]) is a surname. Notable people with the surname include:

- Bob Slowik (born 1954), American football coach
- Bobby Slowik (born 1987), American football coach
- Carol Thomson Slowik, American college track and field coach
- Dariusz Slowik (born 1977), Polish-Canadian discus thrower
- Edward Slowik, American philosopher
- Jakub Słowik (born 1991), Polish footballer
- Julian Slowik, The Menu character
- Kenneth Slowik (born 1954), American cellist, viol player and conductor
- Peter Slowik (born 1957), American classical violist
- Ryan Slowik, American football coach (son of Bob Slowik)

== Other ==
- Słowik, Łódź Voivodeship
- Słowik, Świętokrzyskie Voivodeship, Poland
- Słowik, Będzin County, Silesian Voivodeship, Poland
- Słowik, Częstochowa County, Silesian Voivodeship, Poland
- CWL SK-1 Słowik
