= Szewce =

Szewce may refer to the following places in Poland:

- Szewce, Lower Silesian Voivodeship (south-west Poland)
- Szewce, Kuyavian-Pomeranian Voivodeship (north-central Poland)
- Szewce, Lublin Voivodeship (east Poland)
- Szewce, Kielce County in Świętokrzyskie Voivodeship (south-central Poland)
- Szewce, Sandomierz County in Świętokrzyskie Voivodeship (south-central Poland)
- Szewce, Masovian Voivodeship (east-central Poland)
- Szewce, Gmina Buk in Greater Poland Voivodeship (west-central Poland)
- Szewce, Gmina Kleszczewo in Greater Poland Voivodeship (west-central Poland)
- Szewce, Gdańsk in Pomeranian Voivodeship (north-west Poland)
