= Słowik =

Słowik may refer to:

- Słowik, Łódź Voivodeship (central Poland)
- Słowik, Będzin County in Silesian Voivodeship (south Poland)
- Słowik, Świętokrzyskie Voivodeship (south-central Poland)
- Słowik, Częstochowa County in Silesian Voivodeship (south Poland)

== See also ==
- Slowik (surname)
