= Bolechowice =

Bolechowice may refer to the following places:

- Bolechowice, Lesser Poland Voivodeship (south Poland)
- Bolechowice, Masovian Voivodeship (east-central Poland)
- Bolechowice, Świętokrzyskie Voivodeship (south-central Poland)
