= Sławik =

Sławik, Slawik, Slawick are surnames. In many cases, they originated as alternative spellings of Czech Slavík or Slovak Slávik, both meaning "nightingale".

- Henryk Sławik (1894–1944), Polish politician, diplomat, and social worker
- Mateusz Sławik (born 1980), Polish football goalkeeper

== Slawik ==
- Alexander Slawik (1900–1997), Bohemian-Austrian Japanologist
- Alfred Slawik (1913–1973), Austrian SS-Oberscharführer
- Eckhard Slawik, German astronomer and photographer
- Franz Slawik (1936–1993), Austrian politician
- Johannes Slawik (born 1892), Silesian-German Nazi-politician
- Nora Slawik (born 1962), American politician

== Slawick ==
- Marcel Slawick, French football referee

== See also ==
- Slavik
- Slavíček
- Słowik (disambiguation)
