= Piotr Zgorzelski =

Polish politician

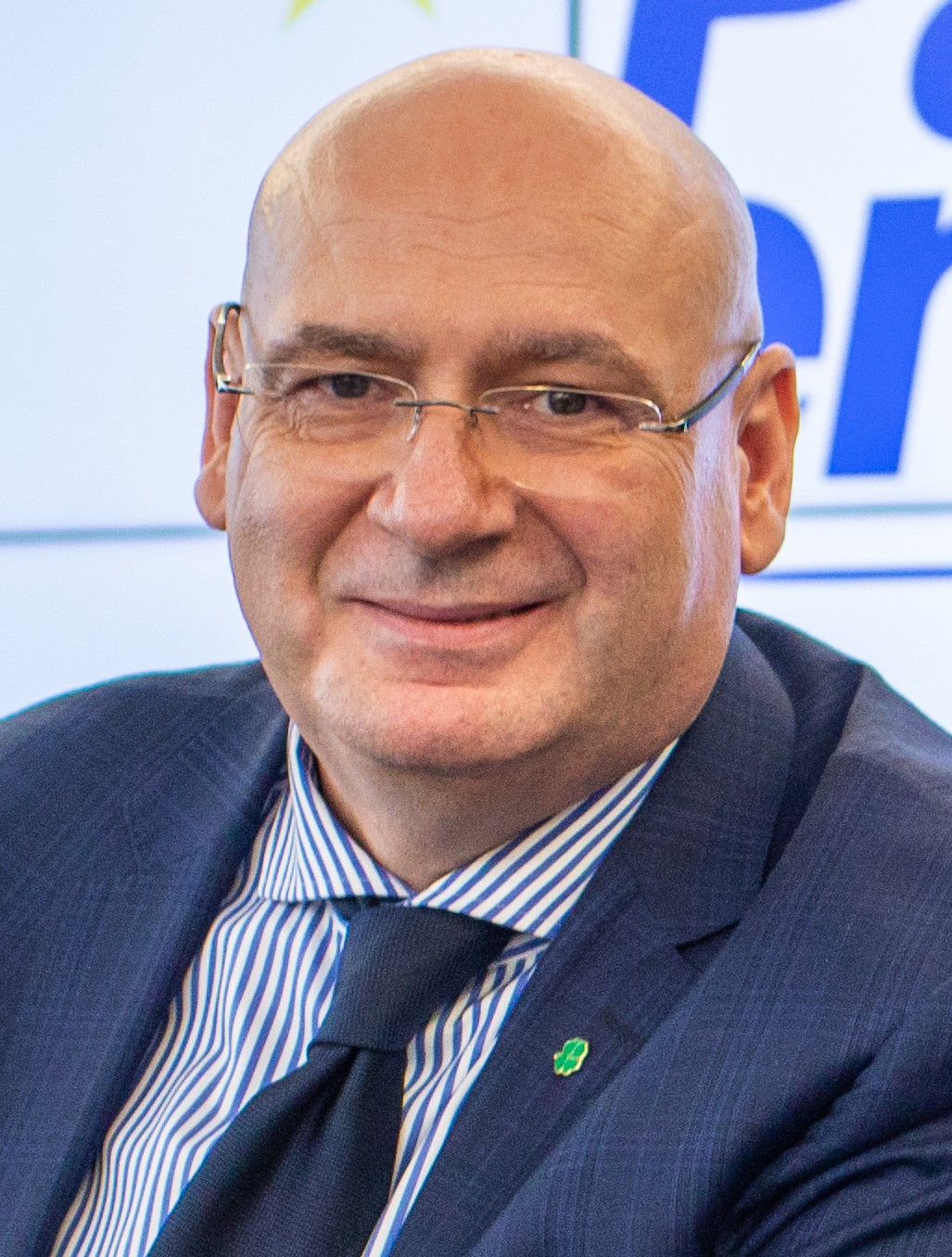

Deputy Marshal of the Sejm
- Incumbent
- Assumed office 12 November 2019
- Marshal: Elżbieta Witek; Szymon Hołownia; Włodzimierz Czarzasty

Personal details
- Born: 17 September 1963 (age 63)
- Party: Confederation of Independent Poland (in 1980s); Polish People's Party
- Education: University of Łódź (MA, 1990); Nicolaus Copernicus University in Toruń (2002); Paweł Włodkowic College in Płock (2007); University of Warsaw (2010)
- Occupation: Politician, teacher

Piotr Zgorzelski (born 17 September 1963) is a Polish politician and teacher, who served as the starosta of Płock County from 2010 to 2011. He was elected to serve as an MP in the Sejm in 2011, re-elected in 2015, 2019, and 2023. He has been serving as a Deputy Marshal of the Sejm since 12 November 2019.

== Life and career ==
Zgorzelski earned degrees in history from the University of Łódź (1990), economics from the Nicolaus Copernicus University in Toruń (2002), European integration studies from the Paweł Włodkowic College in Płock (2007), and management from the University of Warsaw (2010).

Beginning his career in education in 1983, Zgorzelski worked as a teacher at primary schools in Ciachcin and Leszczyn Szlachecki, later becoming the headmaster of the latter from 1992 to 1998. Transitioning into politics, he served as the deputy wójt of Bielsk commune for four years and was elected to the Płock district council in successive local government elections. In 2003, he became director of the Płock delegation of the Marshal's Office of the Mazovian Voivodeship and, in 2010, ascended to the position of starosta of Płock County, succeeding Michał Boszka.

Politically, Zgorzelski has been actively involved since the 1980s, initially with the Confederation of Independent Poland and later with the Polish People's Party (PSL), where he served as vice-president of the voivodeship structures and president of the party's powiat structures. In 2015, he was appointed Secretary of the PSL Supreme Executive Committee. His parliamentary endeavours began with unsuccessful runs for the Senate in 2005 and the Sejm in 2007. However, in the 2011 elections, he secured a seat in the Sejm, a success he replicated in subsequent elections in 2015, 2019, and 2023, demonstrating increasing voter support.

On 12 November 2019, Zgorzelski was elected Deputy Marshal of the 9th Sejm, a role he was re-elected to on 13 November 2023 for the 10th Sejm. The décor of Deputy Marshal Zgorzelski's office includes, in his own words, 'signs of agrarian identity' that represent his political group. These include the green colour of the walls and upholstery (PSL colours), the bust of Wincenty Witos, the historic banner of the Polish People's Party organisation in Łomianki, and the painting 'Forest Landscape' by Maurice Monier from 1887.

== Honours ==
He was awarded the Bronze Cross of Merit in 2004 and the Decoration of Honour for Contributions to Local Government in 2015.

== Private life ==
He has four children from three previous relationships. Zgorzelski is interested in history and agriculture.
