= Zajączków, Świętokrzyskie Voivodeship =

Zajączków
- Village
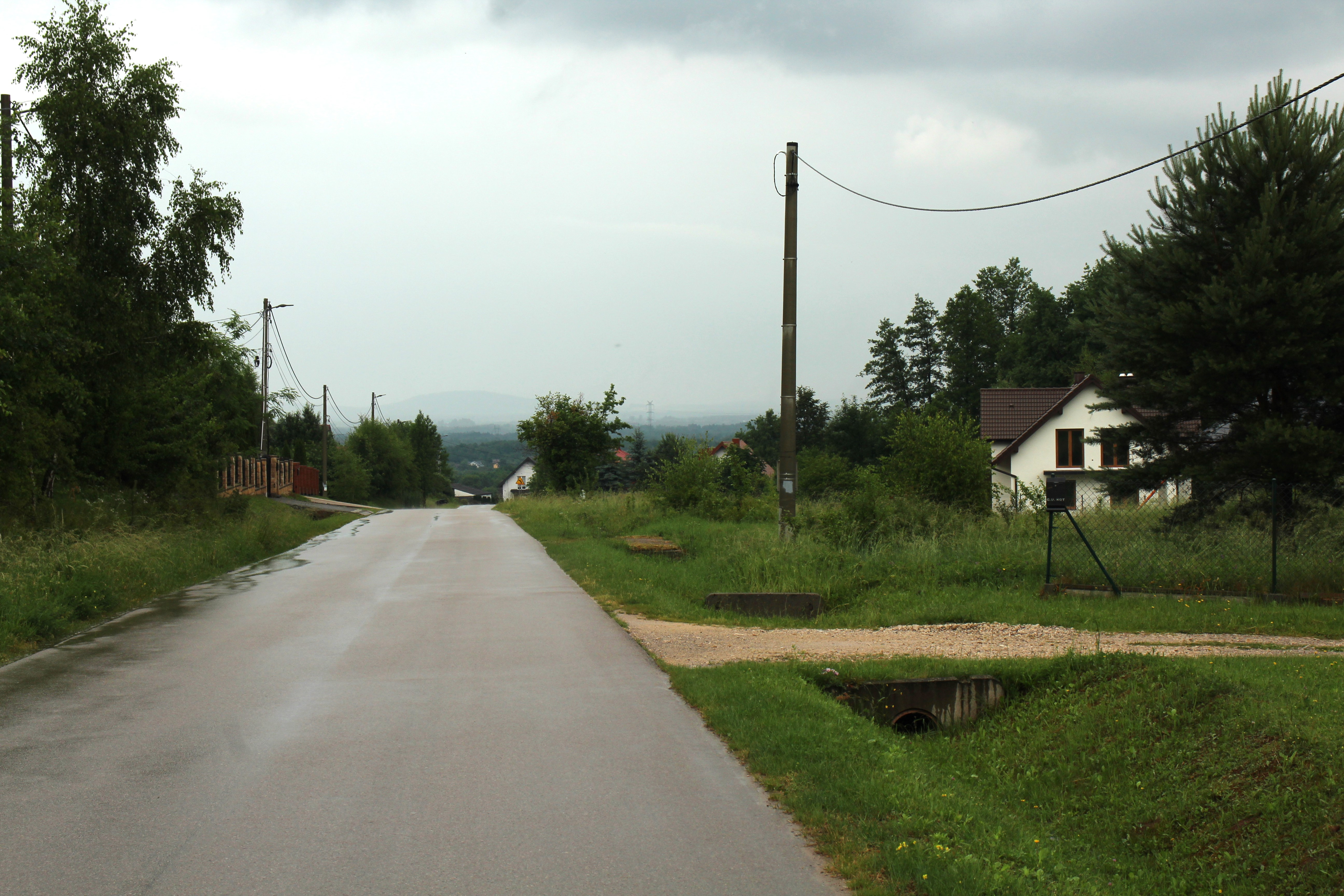

- Location within Poland
- Coordinates: 50°51′22″N 20°20′59″E
- Country: Poland
- Voivodeship: Świętokrzyskie
- County: Kielce
- Gmina: Piekoszów
- Population: 900

Zajączków [zaˈjɔnt͡ʂkuf] is a village in the administrative district of Gmina Piekoszów, within Kielce County, Świętokrzyskie Voivodeship, in south-central Poland. It lies approximately 9 km (6 mi) west of Piekoszów and 19 km (12 mi) west of the regional capital Kielce.
