= Wincentów, Kielce County =

Wincentów
- Village
- Location within Poland
- Coordinates: 50°52′59″N 20°26′25″E
- Country: Poland
- Voivodeship: Świętokrzyskie
- County: Kielce
- Gmina: Piekoszów
- Population: 660

Wincentów [vinˈt͡sɛntuf] is a village in the administrative district of Gmina Piekoszów, within Kielce County, Świętokrzyskie Voivodeship, in south-central Poland. It lies approximately 2 km (1 mi) west of Piekoszów and 13 km (8 mi) west of the regional capital Kielce.
