= Sitkówka =

- Village
- Location within Poland
- Coordinates: 50°48′57″N 20°33′19″E
- Country: Poland
- Voivodeship: Świętokrzyskie
- County: Kielce
- Gmina: Sitkówka-Nowiny
- Population: 432

Sitkówka [ɕitˈkufka] is a village in the administrative district of Gmina Nowiny, within Kielce County, Świętokrzyskie Voivodeship, in south-central Poland. It lies approximately 1 km (1 mi) east of Nowiny and 9 km (6 mi) south-west of the regional capital Kielce.
