= Micigózd =

- Village
- Location within Poland
- Coordinates: 50°53′58″N 20°27′27″E
- Country: Poland
- Voivodeship: Świętokrzyskie
- County: Kielce
- Gmina: Piekoszów
- Population: 990

Micigózd [miˈt͡ɕiɡust] is a village in the administrative district of Gmina Piekoszów, within Kielce County, Świętokrzyskie Voivodeship, in south-central Poland. It lies approximately 2 km (1 mi) north of Piekoszów and 12 km (7 mi) west of the regional capital Kielce.
