= Sękowski =

Sękowski or Seńkowski (feminine: Sękowska, Seńkowski) is a Polish toponymic surname derived form any of locations named Sękowa, Sęków or Sękowo. Outside Poland the surname may be rendered as Sekowski or Senkowski. The Russified form is Senkovsky. Notable people with the surname include:

- Aleksander Seńkowski (1897–1954), Polish aviator and aviation engineer
- Józef Sękowski (1800–1858), Polish-Russian orientalist
- Modest Sękowski (1920–1972), Polish activist of the blind cooperative movement
- Paweł Sękowski (born 1985), Polish historian
- Ray Senkowski
- Ron Senkowski
- Zbigniew Senkowski
