= Lesica, Świętokrzyskie Voivodeship =

Lesica
- Village
- Location within Poland
- Coordinates: 50°52′4″N 20°21′38″E
- Country: Poland
- Voivodeship: Świętokrzyskie
- County: Kielce
- Gmina: Piekoszów
- Population: 250

Lesica [lɛˈɕit͡sa] is a village in the administrative district of Gmina Piekoszów, within Kielce County, Świętokrzyskie Voivodeship, in south-central Poland. It lies approximately 8 km (5 mi) west of Piekoszów and 19 km (12 mi) west of the regional capital Kielce.
