= Sienkiewicz Street, Kielce =

Street in Kielce, Poland

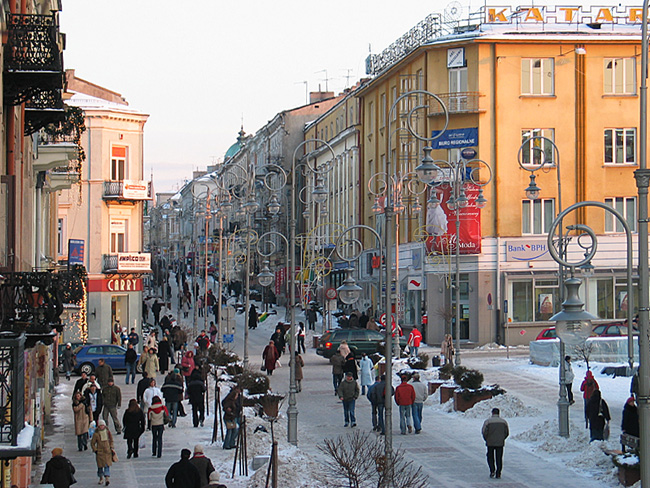
Sienkiewicza Street in winter - the intersection of ul. Kapitulna

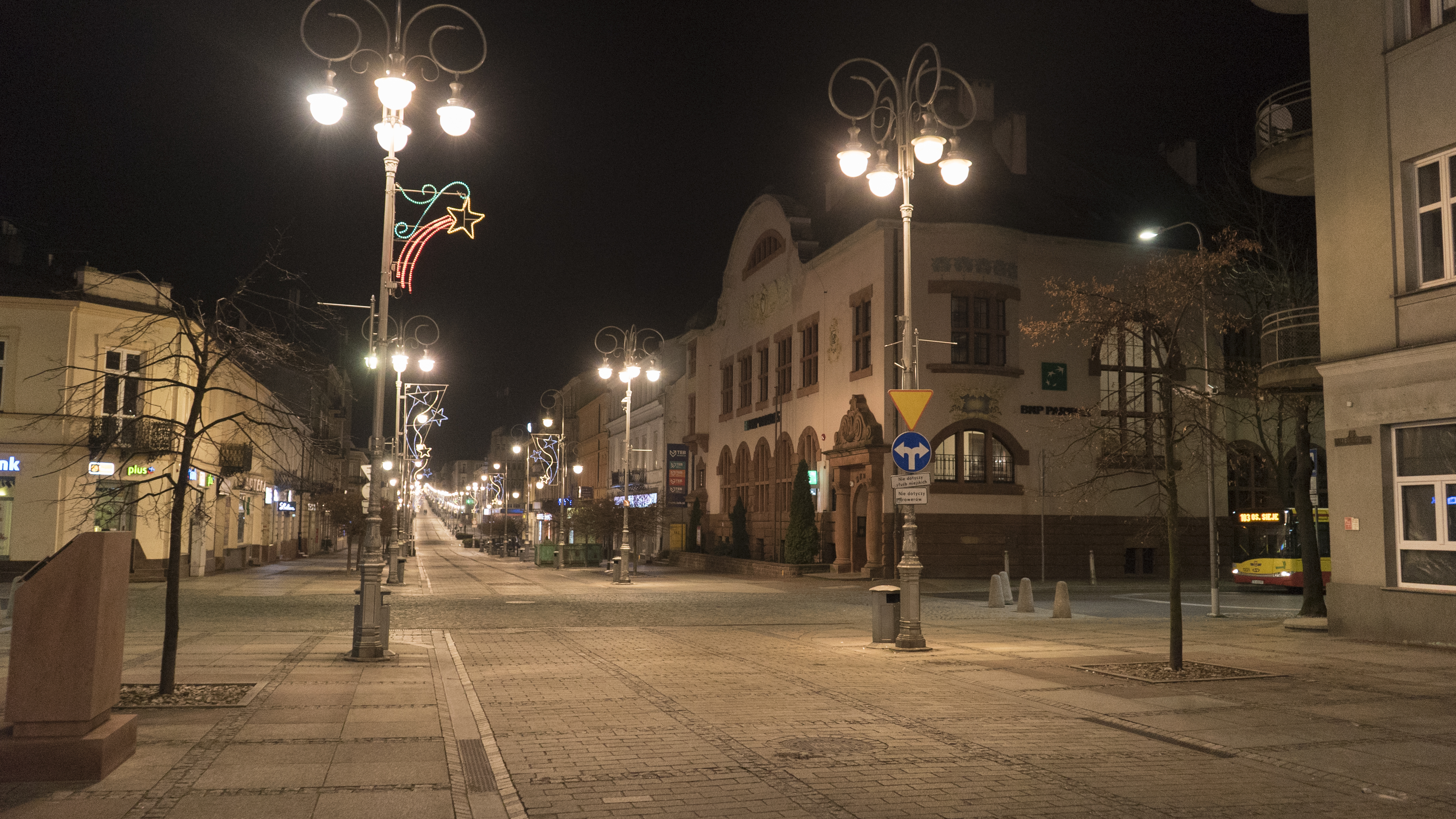
The intersection of Sienkiewicza and Paderewskiego photographed at night

Henryk Sienkiewicz Street in Kielce (Polish: ulica Henryka Sienkiewicza) is the main commercial and historic "artery" of the city of Kielce, Poland. It was built in the middle of the 19th century. It was originally called ulica Konstantego (Constantine Street), then Postal Street and in 1919 it received its present name. Shops and department stores are located there as well as historic buildings and monuments. It is approximately 1270 meters long and runs from the railway station situated next to the Independence square to the Moniuszko Square.

== History ==
The early street began at the end of the 17th century. At that time, Kielce had about 1500 permanent inhabitants. In 1789 there were only six brick houses – four of them were situated right by the main square and the other two on Mała street. The city had 252 houses then. The coming Sienkiewicza street ran between the “bishops’ town” and the residences of citizens. It wasn't covered with any paving, as a result mud was an everyday occurrence there. In the easterly direction, the road disappeared in fields, while it led to the swampy bank of the Silnica River to the west.

In 1821 Marian Potocki, an official land surveyor of the Polish Kingdom, created a spatial planning of Kielce. The plan considered in its conception the leading role of Kielce as an administrative, educational and service center. The city attempted to become modernized without radical redevelopment of the downtown by the growth of areas of settlement, and adjustment of currently existing streets while building new ones. According to Potocki's plan, Sienkiewicza street had its beginning next to the Leonarda square, while the other end led to nowhere. It didn't end at the designed square at the junction of Leśna and Kapitulna streets but it went all the way to Silnica and continued onwards in a westerly direction. Probably, the plan was to merge Sienkiewicza with the centre of mining and ferrous metallurgy. (Czarnów, Górki Szczukowskie, Karczówka)

In 1823, the present Sienkiewicz Street, on the initiative of Marian Potocki, was named Constantine Street after the Grand Duke Constantine Pavlovich of Russia, the chief executive officer of the Polish Kingdom army. He was the most important personage in the Polish Kingdom and in fact (after the death of general Józef Zajączek) also the tsarist governor. Konstanty street was cobbled in order to enable water transport in case of fire and quicker and also because it led to government offices (mortgagees, post offices and school). It ended at the junction of Leśna and Kapitulna Streets.

At that time the Silnica River wasn't bridged. In order to cross the river citizens had to ford it. After the outbreak of the November Uprising the Konstanty street began to be called Postal Street – after the building of a post office that was situated on it. Soon it became the representative street of the city. In 1840 an impressive house with stables, inns and a theatre hall was built. Attached to the building there was a mortgagee, a post office and a school. In 1887 an industrialist, Ludwik Stumpf, began construction of the theatre which was, soon afterwards, called the Ludwik Theatre (nowadays Stefan Żeromski Theatre). Many people came there to watch performances. Among the audience were local gentry, citizens, youths and Russian officers of regiments stationing in the city.

On July 5, 1881, a concession was granted to build a road which was to connect Dęblin with Zagłebie Dąbrowskie. Soon, contractors started building the railway and along with tracks also a station. The first steam locomotive came to Kielce on December 21, 1883. The building of the railway station was finished in 1885. It was erected in the middle of the field, on the line of Sienkiewicz Street. This construction lasted until the 1960s.

Originally, when a small bridge was built on the Silnica, the part of the street which was marked off was called Russian Street, or more popularly, Railway Street. Thanks to that investment a big building space between the city and the railway station came into being. The extension of the street involved social changes.

Marking out another part of today's Sienkiewicz Street resulted in the inflow of Jews to Kielce. They started to invest in building lots. Between the Czysta and Żelazna Streets, on the southern side, there was a non-built-up area on which arable lands were located. It was surrounded by a fence from side of the Sienkiewicz Street.

In 2019, a statue of Stanisław Ignacy Łaszczyński was erected at the intersection with Ignacego Paderewskiego Street.
