= Ryan Slowik =

American football player (born 1980/81)

New York Jets
- Title: Safeties coach

Personal information
- Born: 1980 or 1981 (age 45–46)

Career information
- Position: Safety
- College: Youngstown State (1999–2000); Wisconsin–Oshkosh (2001–2003)

Career history
- Green Bay Packers (2003) Personnel intern; Wisconsin–Oshkosh (2004) Assistant secondary coach; Denver Broncos (2005–2008); Defensive assistant (2005–2006); Assistant special teams coach (2007); Assistant defensive backs coach (2008); Arizona Cardinals (2009–2014); Defensive quality control coach (2009–2011); Outside linebackers coach (2012); Defensive assistant / assistant defensive backs coach (2013–2014); New York Jets (2015) Assistant defensive line coach; Cleveland Browns (2016) Outside linebackers coach; Tennessee (2017) Defensive analyst; Webb School of Knoxville (2019) Assistant coach; Miami Dolphins (2022–2025); Senior defensive assistant (2022); Outside linebackers coach (2023); Defensive backs coach / pass game specialist (2024–2025); New York Jets (2026–present) Safeties coach

Ryan Slowik (born 1980 or 1981) is an American football coach and former player who is the safeties coach for the New York Jets of the National Football League (NFL). he played college football for the Youngstown State Penguins and Wisconsin–Oshkosh Titans and has had stints with the Green Bay Packers, Wisconsin–Oshkosh, Denver Broncos, Arizona Cardinals, New York Jets, Cleveland Browns, Tennessee, and the Webb School of Knoxville.

== Personal life ==
Slowik’s mother is Carol Thomson Slowik and his is father is Bob Slowik, who is the defensive coordinator for the Calgary Stampeders of the CFL and previously served as the defensive coordinator of the Chicago Bears, Cleveland Browns, Green Bay Packers, and Denver Broncos in the NFL and the Montreal Alouettes of the CFL.

He has two younger brothers - Bobby Slowik, who currently works for the Dolphins, as the team's offensive coordinator; and Steve Slowik, who currently works for the 49ers, as a pro scout.

He grew up in Gainesville, Florida, and played college football as a safety for the Youngstown State Penguins from 1999 to 2000, before transferring and playing from 2001 to 2003 with the Wisconsin–Oshkosh Titans.

He is married to Valerie Slowik and they have 2 children Tye and Averie.

== Coaching career ==
Slowik began his coaching career in 2003 as a personnel intern for the Green Bay Packers. He then returned to Wisconsin–Oshkosh in 2004 as assistant secondary coach. In 2005, he became a defensive assistant with the Denver Broncos. Two years later, he was named assistant special teams coach, and then in 2008, he was the team's assistant defensive backs coach.

Slowik became the defensive quality control coach for the Arizona Cardinals in 2009. He was promoted to outside linebackers coach in 2012. He then was the team's assistant defensive backs coach and a defensive assistant from 2013 to 2014. In 2015, he served as the assistant defensive line coach for the New York Jets. He then joined the Cleveland Browns in 2016 as outside linebackers coach, but was one of several staff members fired after the season. Slowik served as a defensive analyst for the Tennessee Volunteers in 2017, and spent 2018 as the head of operations at a sports training facility. He became an assistant coach at the Webb School of Knoxville in 2019.

In 2022, Slowik joined the Miami Dolphins as senior defensive assistant. He was promoted to outside linebackers coach in 2023. He was reported as among the candidates for the team's defensive coordinator role in 2024.

On February 12, 2026, Slowik was hired again by the New York Jets as their safeties coach under head coach Aaron Glenn.

== Extenral links ==
- New York Jets profile
