= Łubno, Świętokrzyskie Voivodeship =

Łubno
- Village
- Location within Poland
- Coordinates: 50°53′36″N 20°23′13″E
- Country: Poland
- Voivodeship: Świętokrzyskie
- County: Kielce
- Gmina: Piekoszów
- Population: 280

Łubno [ˈwubnɔ] is a village in the administrative district of Gmina Piekoszów, within Kielce County, Świętokrzyskie Voivodeship, in south-central Poland. It lies approximately 6 km (4 mi) west of Piekoszów and 17 km (11 mi) west of the regional capital Kielce.
