= Wesoła (disambiguation) =

Wesoła is a district of Warsaw.

Wesoła may also refer to the following places in Poland:

- Wesoła, part of the Grzegórzki district of Kraków
- Wesoła, Lesser Poland Voivodeship (south Poland)
- Wesoła, Subcarpathian Voivodeship (south-east Poland)
- Wesoła, Świętokrzyskie Voivodeship (south-central Poland)
- Wesoła, Siedlce County in Masovian Voivodeship (east-central Poland)
- Wesoła, Sochaczew County in Masovian Voivodeship (east-central Poland)
- Wesoła, Gmina Łęka Opatowska in Greater Poland Voivodeship (west-central Poland)
- Wesoła, Gmina Rychtal in Greater Poland Voivodeship (west-central Poland)
- Wesoła, Gliwice County in Silesian Voivodeship (south Poland)
- Wesoła, Opole Voivodeship (south-west Poland)
- Wesoła, West Pomeranian Voivodeship (north-west Poland)
- Wesoła, Mysłowice in Silesian Voivodeship (south Poland)
