= Młynki =

Młynki may refer to the following places:

- Młynki, Kuyavian-Pomeranian Voivodeship (north-central Poland)
- Młynki, Bełchatów County in Łódź Voivodeship (central Poland)
- Młynki, Pajęczno County in Łódź Voivodeship (central Poland)
- Młynki, Lublin Voivodeship (east Poland)
- Młynki, Świętokrzyskie Voivodeship (south-central Poland)
- Młynki, Masovian Voivodeship (east-central Poland)
- Młynki, Greater Poland Voivodeship (west-central Poland)
- Młynki, Chojnice County in Pomeranian Voivodeship (north Poland)
- Młynki, Starogard County in Pomeranian Voivodeship (north Poland)
- Młynki, Tczew County in Pomeranian Voivodeship (north Poland)
- Młynki, Wejherowo County in Pomeranian Voivodeship (north Poland)
