= Bławatków =

- Village
- Location within Poland
- Coordinates: 50°51′N 20°22′E
- Country: Poland
- Voivodeship: Świętokrzyskie
- County: Kielce
- Gmina: Piekoszów

Bławatków [bwaˈvatkuf] is a village in the administrative district of Gmina Piekoszów, within Kielce County, Świętokrzyskie Voivodeship, in south-central Poland. It lies approximately 8 km (5 mi) south-west of Piekoszów and 18 km (11 mi) west of the regional capital Kielce.
