= Rykoszyn =

- Village
- Location within Poland
- Coordinates: 50°51′33″N 20°24′12″E
- Country: Poland
- Voivodeship: Świętokrzyskie
- County: Kielce
- Gmina: Piekoszów
- Population: 970

Rykoszyn [rɨˈkɔʂɨn] is a village in the administrative district of Gmina Piekoszów, within Kielce County, Świętokrzyskie Voivodeship, in south-central Poland. It lies approximately 5 km (3 mi) south-west of Piekoszów and 16 km (10 mi) west of the regional capital Kielce.
