= Gmina Bielsk =

Gmina Bielsk Bielsk Commune
- Gmina
- Coat of arms
- Interactive map of Gmina Bielsk
- Coordinates (Bielsk): 52°40′17″N 19°48′17″E
- Country: Poland
- Voivodeship: Masovian
- County: Płock County
- Seat: Bielsk

Area
  - Total: 125.53 km^{2} (48.47 sq mi)

Population (2006)
  - Total: 8,936
  - Density: 71.19/km^{2} (184.4/sq mi)
- Time zone: UTC+1 (CET)
  - Summer (DST): UTC+2 (CEST)
- Vehicle registration: WPL

Gmina Bielsk is a rural gmina (administrative district) in Płock County, Masovian Voivodeship, in central Poland. Its seat is the village of Bielsk, which lies approximately 16 kilometres (10 mi) north-east of Płock and 96 km (60 mi) north-west of Warsaw.

The gmina covers an area of 125.53 square kilometres (48.5 sq mi), and as of 2006 its total population is 8,936.

== Villages ==
Gmina Bielsk contains the villages and settlements of Bielsk, Bolechowice, Cekanowo, Ciachcin, Ciachcin Nowy, Dębsk, Drwały, Dziedzice, Gilino, Giżyno, Goślice, Jączewo, Jaroszewo Biskupie, Jaroszewo-Wieś, Józinek, Kędzierzyn, Kleniewo, Kłobie, Konary, Kuchary-Jeżewo, Leszczyn Księży, Leszczyn Szlachecki, Lubiejewo, Machcinko, Machcino, Niszczyce, Niszczyce-Pieńki, Pęszyno, Rudowo, Sękowo, Śmiłowo, Smolino, Strusino, Szewce, Tchórz, Tłubice, Ułtowo, Umienino, Zągoty, Zagroba, Zakrzewo and Żukowo.

== Neighbouring gminas ==
Gmina Bielsk is bordered by the gminas of Drobin, Gozdowo, Radzanowo, Stara Biała, Staroźreby and Zawidz.
