= Drwały =

Drwały may refer to the following places:

- Drwały, Gmina Bielsk in Masovian Voivodeship (east-central Poland)
- Drwały, Gmina Wyszogród in Masovian Voivodeship (east-central Poland)
- Drwały, Pułtusk County in Masovian Voivodeship (east-central Poland)
