= Cekanowo =

Cekanowo may refer to the following places in Poland:

- Cekanowo, Gmina Bielsk
- Cekanowo, Gmina Słupno
