= Kowala, Kielce County =

Kowala
- Village
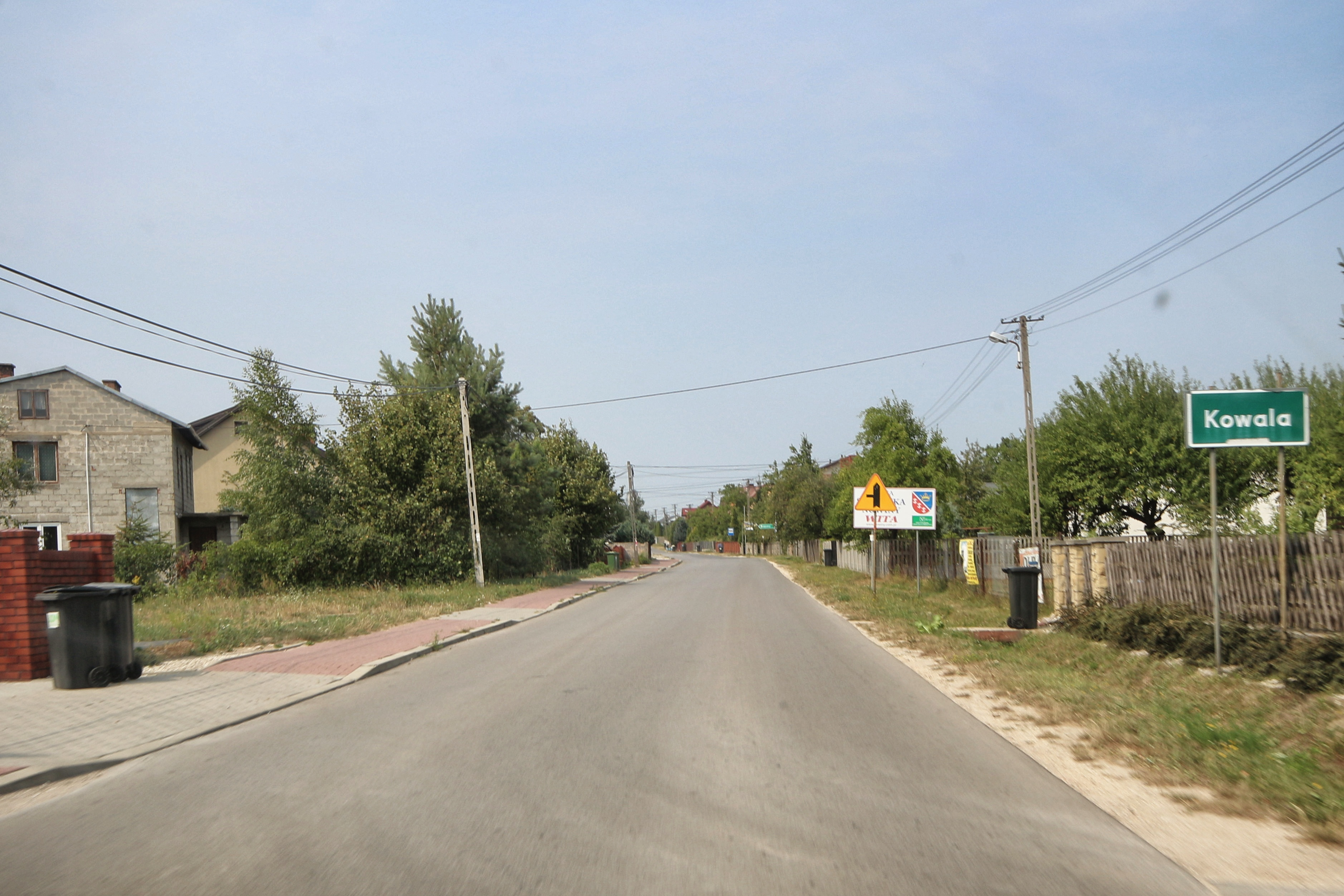

- Location within Poland
- Coordinates: 50°47′43″N 20°35′7″E
- Country: Poland
- Voivodeship: Świętokrzyskie
- County: Kielce
- Gmina: Sitkówka-Nowiny
- Population: 936

Kowala [kɔˈvala] is a village in the administrative district of Gmina Sitkówka-Nowiny, within Kielce County, Świętokrzyskie Voivodeship, in south-central Poland. It lies approximately 4 km (2 mi) south-east of Osiedle-Nowiny and 11 km (7 mi) south of the regional capital Kielce.

== People ==
- Tadeusz Wojda (b. 1957), Roman Catholic bishop
