= Gałęzice =

- Village
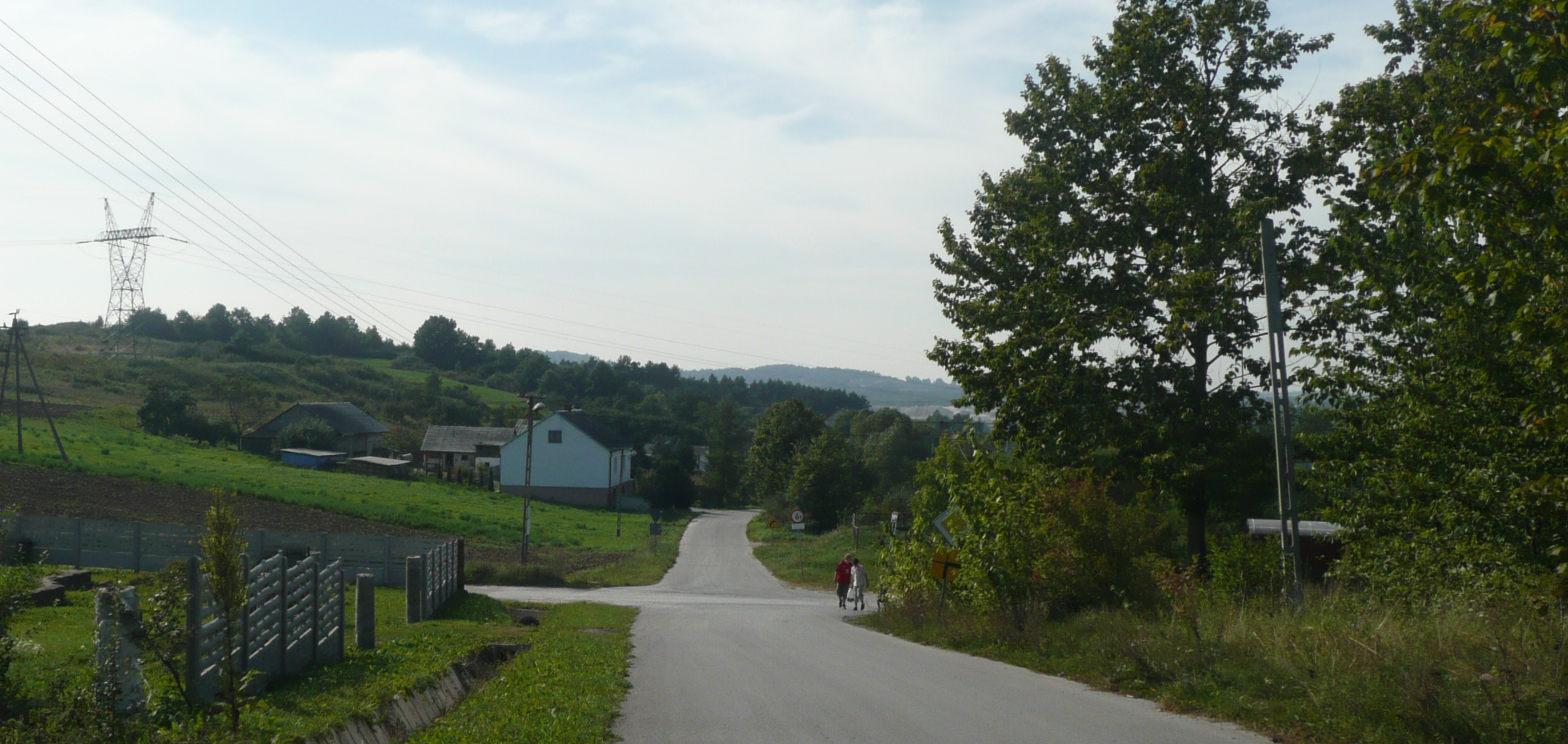

- Location within Poland
- Coordinates: 50°50′34″N 20°24′51″E
- Country: Poland
- Voivodeship: Świętokrzyskie
- County: Kielce
- Gmina: Piekoszów
- Population: 380
- Website: www.galezice.witryna.info

Gałęzice [ɡawɛ̃ˈʑit͡sɛ] is a village in the administrative district of Gmina Piekoszów, within Kielce County, Świętokrzyskie Voivodeship, in south-central Poland. It lies approximately 6 km (4 mi) south-west of Piekoszów and 15 km (9 mi) west of the regional capital Kielce.
