= Brynica, Świętokrzyskie Voivodeship =

Brynica
- Village
- Location within Poland
- Coordinates: 50°54′16″N 20°30′14″E
- Country: Poland
- Voivodeship: Świętokrzyskie
- County: Kielce
- Gmina: Piekoszów
- Population: 830

Brynica [brɨˈnit͡sa] is a village in the administrative district of Gmina Piekoszów, within Kielce County, Świętokrzyskie Voivodeship, in south-central Poland. It lies approximately 4 km (2 mi) north-east of Piekoszów and 9 km (6 mi) west of the regional capital Kielce.
