= Łosienek =

- Village
- Location within Poland
- Coordinates: 50°53′17″N 20°21′46″E
- Country: Poland
- Voivodeship: Świętokrzyskie
- County: Kielce
- Gmina: Piekoszów
- Population: 540

Łosienek [wɔˈɕɛnɛk] is a village in the administrative district of Gmina Piekoszów, within Kielce County, Świętokrzyskie Voivodeship, in south-central Poland. It lies approximately 7 km (4 mi) west of Piekoszów and 18 km (11 mi) west of the regional capital Kielce.
