= Zagrody, Kielce County =

Zagrody
- Village
- Location within Poland
- Coordinates: 50°49′43″N 20°31′28″E
- Country: Poland
- Voivodeship: Świętokrzyskie
- County: Kielce
- Gmina: Sitkówka-Nowiny
- Population: 380

Zagrody [zaˈɡrɔdɨ] is a village in the administrative district of Gmina Sitkówka-Nowiny, within Kielce County, Świętokrzyskie Voivodeship, in south-central Poland. It lies approximately 3 km (2 mi) north-west of Osiedle-Nowiny and 9 km (6 mi) south-west of the regional capital Kielce.
