= Slavíček =

Slavíček (feminine: Slavíčková) is a Czech surname. It means nightingale. Notable people with the surname include:

- Antonín Slavíček (1870–1910), Czech painter
- Bohumil Slavíček (born 1991), Czech ice hockey player
- Jan Slavíček (1900–1970), Czech painter
- Jaroslava Slavíčková (born 1953), Czech swimmer
- Jiří Slavíček (1901–1957), Czech screenwriter and director
- Karel Slavíček (1678–1735), Czech Jesuit missionary and scientist

== See also ==
- Slavík, Slavik
- Sławik
