= Szczukowice =

- Village
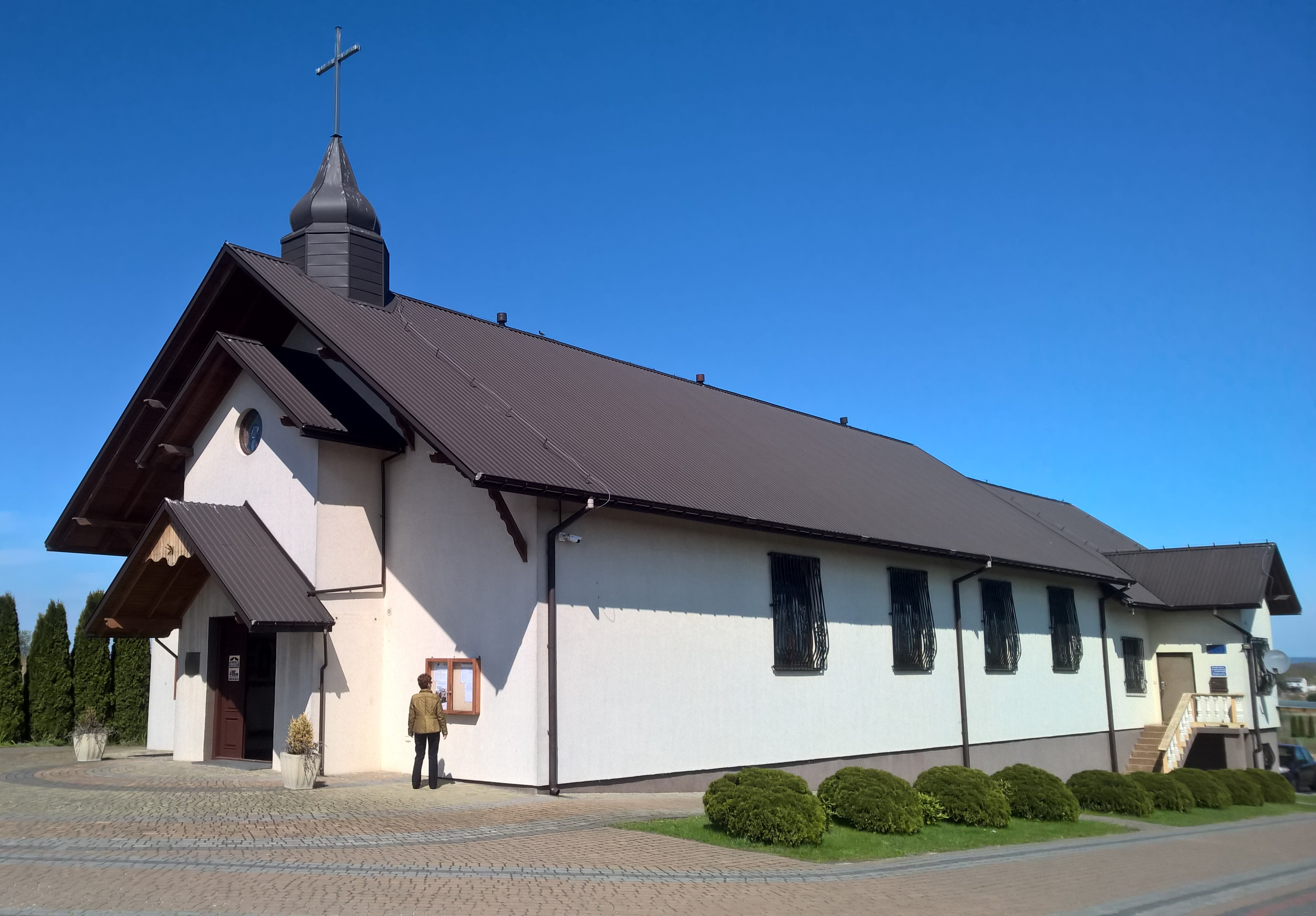

- Location within Poland
- Coordinates: 50°53′12″N 20°30′46″E
- Country: Poland
- Voivodeship: Świętokrzyskie
- County: Kielce
- Gmina: Piekoszów
- Population: 650

Szczukowice [ʂt͡ʂukɔˈvit͡sɛ] is a village in the administrative district of Gmina Piekoszów, within Kielce County, Świętokrzyskie Voivodeship, in south-central Poland. It lies approximately 4 km (2 mi) east of Piekoszów and 8 km (5 mi) west of the regional capital Kielce.
