= Janów, Kielce County =

Janów
- Village
- Location within Poland
- Coordinates: 50°51′25″N 20°30′14″E
- Country: Poland
- Voivodeship: Świętokrzyskie
- County: Kielce
- Gmina: Piekoszów
- Population: 460

Janów [ˈjanuf] is a village in the administrative district of Gmina Piekoszów, within Kielce County, Świętokrzyskie Voivodeship, in south-central Poland. It lies approximately 5 km (3 mi) south-east of Piekoszów and 9 km (6 mi) west of the regional capital Kielce.
