= Zgórsko, Świętokrzyskie Voivodeship =

Zgórsko
- Village
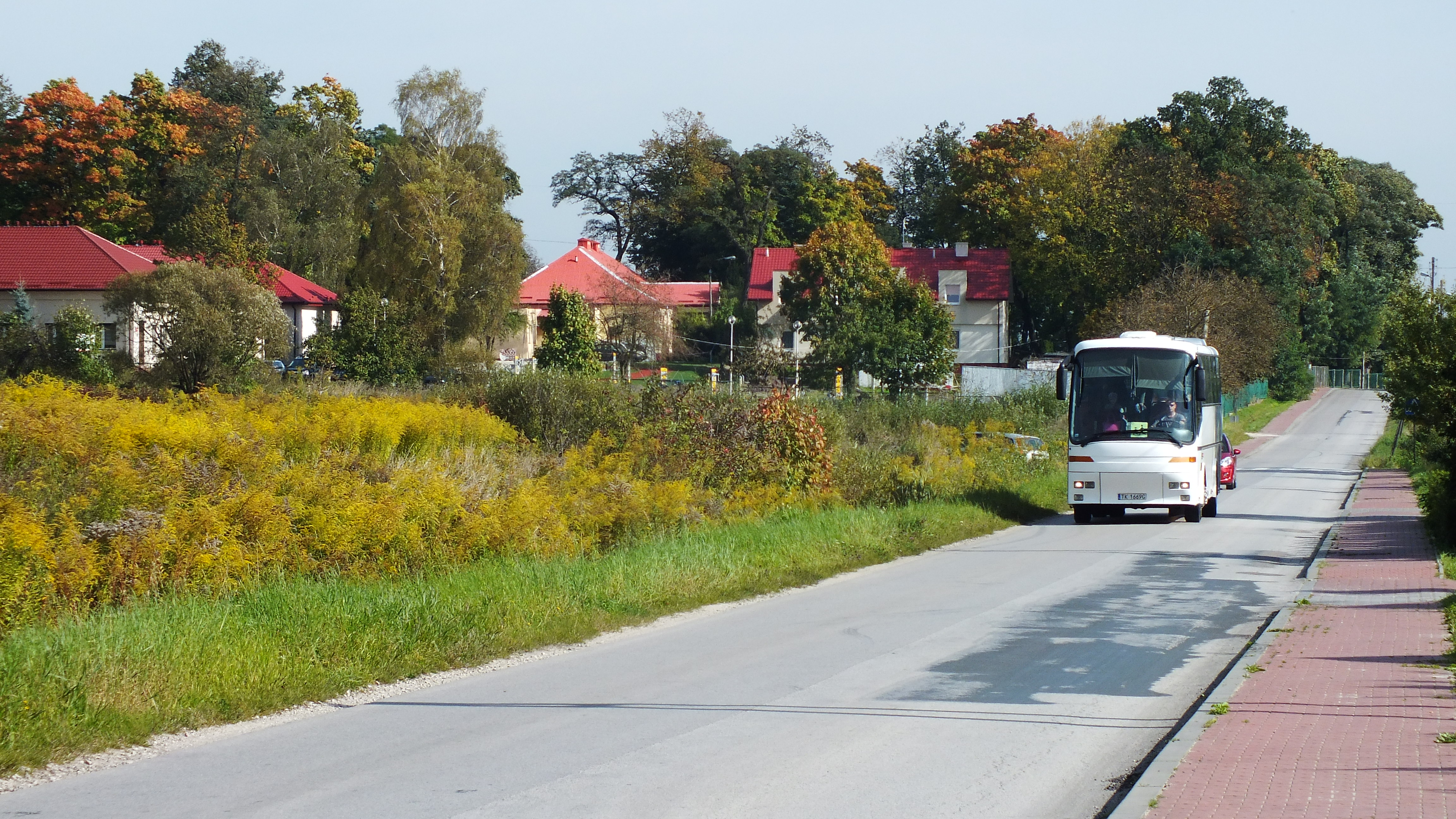

- Location within Poland
- Coordinates: 50°49′22″N 20°31′19″E
- Country: Poland
- Voivodeship: Świętokrzyskie
- County: Kielce
- Gmina: Sitkówka-Nowiny
- Population: 1,185

Zgórsko [ˈzɡurskɔ] is a village in the administrative district of Gmina Sitkówka-Nowiny, within Kielce County, Świętokrzyskie Voivodeship, in south-central Poland. It lies approximately 3 km (2 mi) west of Osiedle-Nowiny and 10 km (6 mi) south-west of the regional capital Kielce.
