= Trzcianki =

Trzcianki may refer to the following places:

- Trzcianki, Puławy County in Lublin Voivodeship (east Poland)
- Trzcianki, Ryki County in Lublin Voivodeship (east Poland)
- Trzcianki, Świętokrzyskie Voivodeship (south-central Poland)
- Trzcianki, Greater Poland Voivodeship (west-central Poland)
