= Wola Murowana =

- Village
- Location within Poland
- Coordinates: 50°47′59″N 20°31′23″E
- Country: Poland
- Voivodeship: Świętokrzyskie
- County: Kielce
- Gmina: Sitkówka-Nowiny
- Population: 375

Wola Murowana [ˈvɔla murɔˈvana] is a village in the administrative district of Gmina Sitkówka-Nowiny, within Kielce County, Świętokrzyskie Voivodeship, in south-central Poland. It lies approximately 3 km (2 mi) south-west of Osiedle-Nowiny and 12 km (7 mi) south-west of the regional capital Kielce.
