= Łosień, Świętokrzyskie Voivodeship =

Łosień
- Village
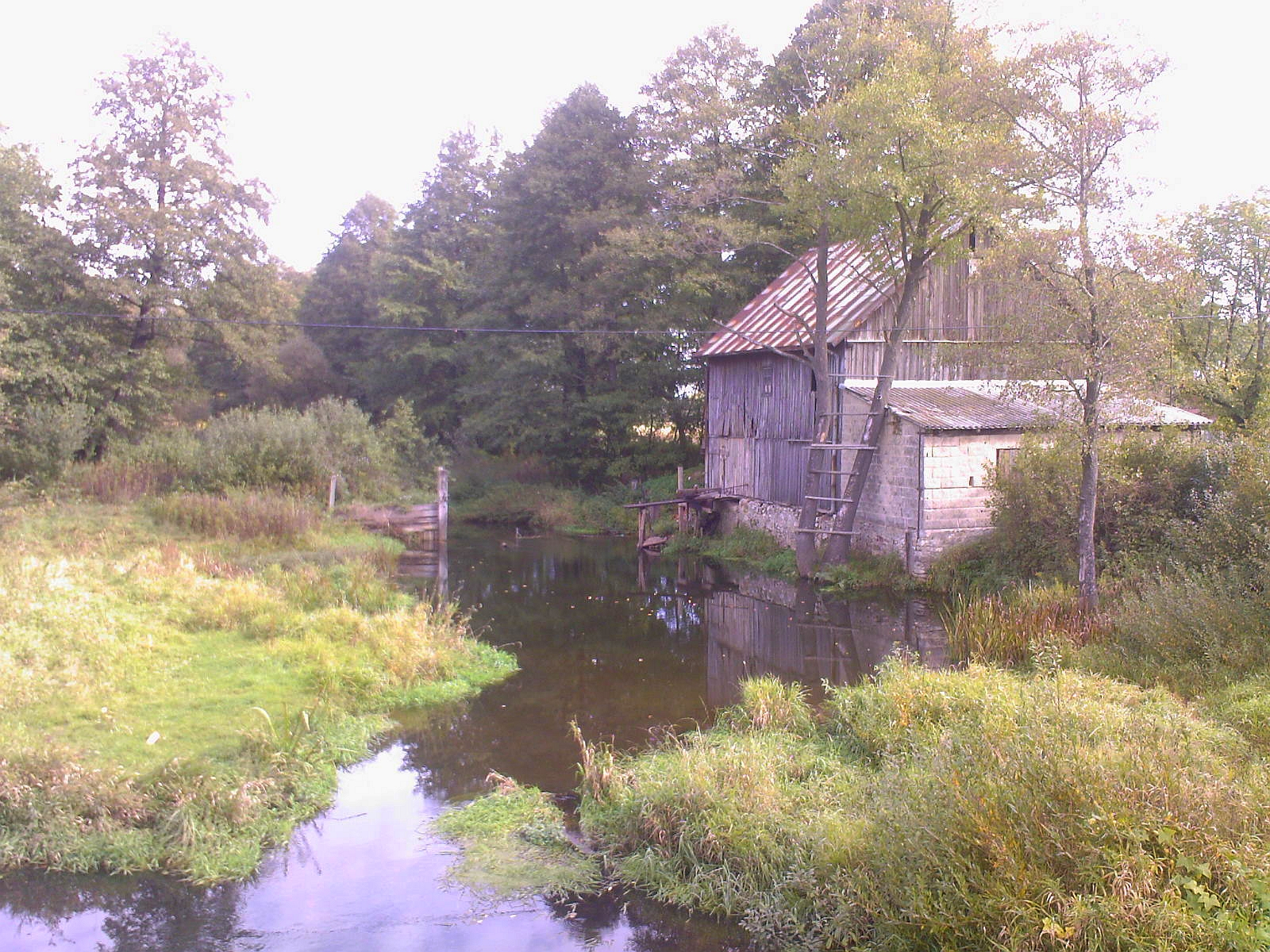

- Location within Poland
- Coordinates: 50°54′22″N 20°22′3″E
- Country: Poland
- Voivodeship: Świętokrzyskie
- County: Kielce
- Gmina: Piekoszów
- Population: 270

Łosień [ˈwɔɕɛɲ] is a village in the administrative district of Gmina Piekoszów, within Kielce County, Świętokrzyskie Voivodeship, in south-central Poland. It lies approximately 8 km (5 mi) west of Piekoszów and 18 km (11 mi) west of the regional capital Kielce.
