= Julianów, Kielce County =

Julianów
- Village
- Location within Poland
- Coordinates: 50°54′18″N 20°28′28″E
- Country: Poland
- Voivodeship: Świętokrzyskie
- County: Kielce
- Gmina: Piekoszów

Julianów [juˈljanuf] is a village in the administrative district of Gmina Piekoszów, within Kielce County, Świętokrzyskie Voivodeship, in south-central Poland. It lies approximately 3 km (2 mi) north of Piekoszów and 11 km (7 mi) west of the regional capital Kielce.
