= Skałka, Świętokrzyskie Voivodeship =

Skałka
- Village
- Location within Poland
- Coordinates: 50°51′29″N 20°23′16″E
- Country: Poland
- Voivodeship: Świętokrzyskie
- County: Kielce
- Gmina: Piekoszów
- Population: 240

Skałka [ˈskau̯ka] is a village in the administrative district of Gmina Piekoszów, within Kielce County, Świętokrzyskie Voivodeship, in south-central Poland. It lies approximately 6 km (4 mi) south-west of Piekoszów and 17 km (11 mi) west of the regional capital Kielce.
