= Gilino =

- Village
- Location within Poland
- Coordinates: 52°39′10″N 19°47′56″E
- Country: Poland
- Voivodeship: Masovian
- County: Płock
- Gmina: Bielsk
- Population: 360

Gilino [ɡiˈlinɔ] is a village in the administrative district of Gmina Bielsk, within Płock County, Masovian Voivodeship, in east-central Poland.
