= Szewce, Kielce County =

Szewce
- Village
- Location within Poland
- Coordinates: 50°50′27″N 20°28′35″E
- Country: Poland
- Voivodeship: Świętokrzyskie
- County: Kielce
- Gmina: Sitkówka-Nowiny
- Population: 423

Szewce [ˈʂɛft͡sɛ] is a village in the administrative district of Gmina Sitkówka-Nowiny, within Kielce County, Świętokrzyskie Voivodeship, in south-central Poland. It lies approximately 6 km (4 mi) north-west of Osiedle-Nowiny and 11 km (7 mi) south-west of the regional capital Kielce.
