= Górki Szczukowskie =

- Village
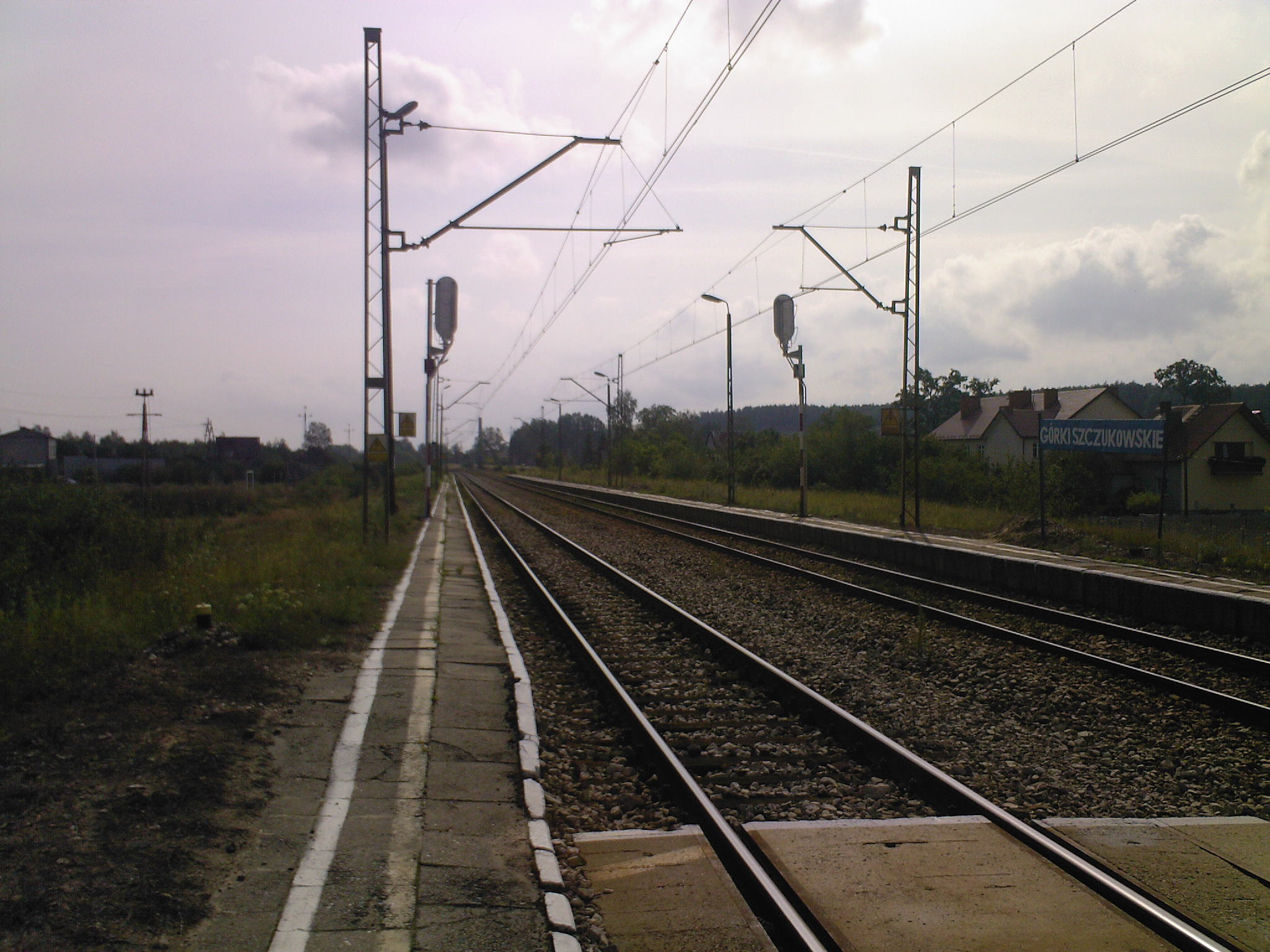
- Railway stop

- Location within Poland
- Coordinates: 50°52′56″N 20°31′19″E
- Country: Poland
- Voivodeship: Świętokrzyskie
- County: Kielce
- Gmina: Piekoszów
- Population: 410

Górki Szczukowskie [ˈɡurki ʂt͡ʂuˈkɔfskʲɛ] is a village in the administrative district of Gmina Piekoszów, within Kielce County, Świętokrzyskie Voivodeship, in south-central Poland. It lies approximately 5 km (3 mi) east of Piekoszów and 7 km (4 mi) west of the regional capital Kielce.
