= Młynki, Świętokrzyskie Voivodeship =

Młynki
- Village
- Location within Poland
- Coordinates: 50°51′10″N 20°18′33″E
- Country: Poland
- Voivodeship: Świętokrzyskie
- County: Kielce
- Gmina: Piekoszów

Młynki [ˈmwɨŋki] is a village in the administrative district of Gmina Piekoszów, within Kielce County, Świętokrzyskie Voivodeship, in south-central Poland. It lies approximately 12 km (7 mi) west of Piekoszów and 22 km (14 mi) west of the regional capital Kielce.
