= Gmina Piekoszów =

Gmina Piekoszów Piekoszów Commune
- Gmina
- Coat of arms
- Interactive map of Gmina Piekoszów
- Coordinates (Piekoszów): 50°52′54″N 20°27′42″E
- Country: Poland
- Voivodeship: Świętokrzyskie
- County: Kielce County
- Seat: Piekoszów

Area
  - Total: 102.48 km^{2} (39.57 sq mi)

Population (2006)
  - Total: 15,249
  - Density: 148.80/km^{2} (385.39/sq mi)
- Website: https://www.piekoszow.pl

Gmina Piekoszów is a rural gmina (administrative district) in Kielce County, Świętokrzyskie Voivodeship, in south-central Poland. Its seat is the city of Piekoszów, which lies approximately 11 kilometres (7 mi) west of the regional capital Kielce.

The gmina covers an area of 102.48 square kilometres (39.6 sq mi), and as of 2006 its total population is 15,249.

The gmina contains part of the protected area called Chęciny-Kielce Landscape Park.

== Villages ==
Gmina Piekoszów contains the villages and settlements of Bławatków, Brynica, Gałęzice, Górki Szczukowskie, Janów, Jaworznia, Jeżynów, Julianów, Łaziska, Lesica, Łosień, Łosienek, Łubno, Micigózd, Młynki, Piekoszów, Podzamcze, Rykoszyn, Skałka, Szczukowice, Wesoła, Wincentów and Zajączków.

== Neighbouring gminas ==
Gmina Piekoszów is bordered by the city of Kielce and by the gminas of Chęciny, Łopuszno, Małogoszcz, Miedziana Góra, Sitkówka-Nowiny and Strawczyn.
