= Niszczyce-Pieńki =

- Village
- Location within Poland
- Coordinates: 52°38′26″N 19°46′7″E
- Country: Poland
- Voivodeship: Masovian
- County: Płock
- Gmina: Bielsk
- Population: 60

Niszczyce-Pieńki [niʂˈt͡ʂɨt͡sɛ ˈpjɛɲki] is a village in the administrative district of Gmina Bielsk, within Płock County, Masovian Voivodeship, in east-central Poland.
