= Jeżynów =

Village in Gmina Piekoszów, Poland

- Village
- Location within Poland
- Coordinates: 50°52′41″N 20°21′34″E
- Country: Poland
- Voivodeship: Świętokrzyskie
- County: Kielce
- Gmina: Piekoszów

Jeżynów [jɛˈʐɨnuf] is a village in the administrative district of Gmina Piekoszów, within Kielce County, Świętokrzyskie Voivodeship, in south-central Poland.
