= Wesoła, Świętokrzyskie Voivodeship =

Wesoła
- Village
- Location within Poland
- Coordinates: 50°51′39″N 20°19′11″E
- Country: Poland
- Voivodeship: Świętokrzyskie
- County: Kielce
- Gmina: Piekoszów
- Population: 160

Wesoła [vɛˈsɔwa] is a village in the administrative district of Gmina Piekoszów, within Kielce County, Świętokrzyskie Voivodeship, in south-central Poland. It lies approximately 11 km (7 mi) west of Piekoszów and 22 km (14 mi) west of the regional capital Kielce.
