= Zawada, Kielce County =

Zawada
- Village
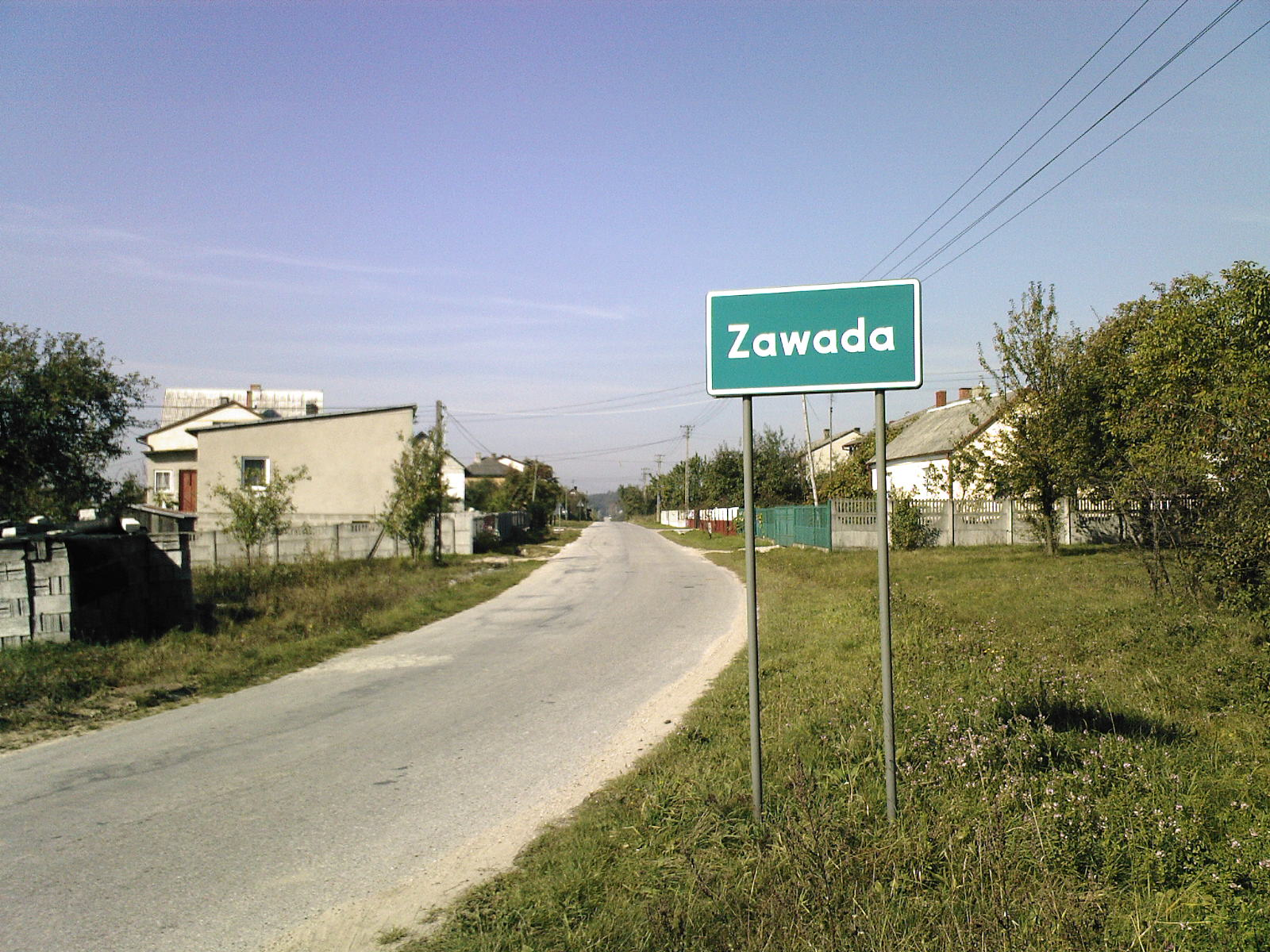

- Location within Poland
- Coordinates: 50°50′39″N 20°27′30″E
- Country: Poland
- Voivodeship: Świętokrzyskie
- County: Kielce
- Gmina: Sitkówka-Nowiny
- Population: 155

Zawada [zaˈvada] is a village in the administrative district of Gmina Sitkówka-Nowiny, within Kielce County, Świętokrzyskie Voivodeship, in south-central Poland.
