= Tadeusz Wojda =

Polish prelate of the Catholic Church (born 1957)

The Most Reverend Tadeusz Wojda S.A.C.
- Archbishop of Gdańsk
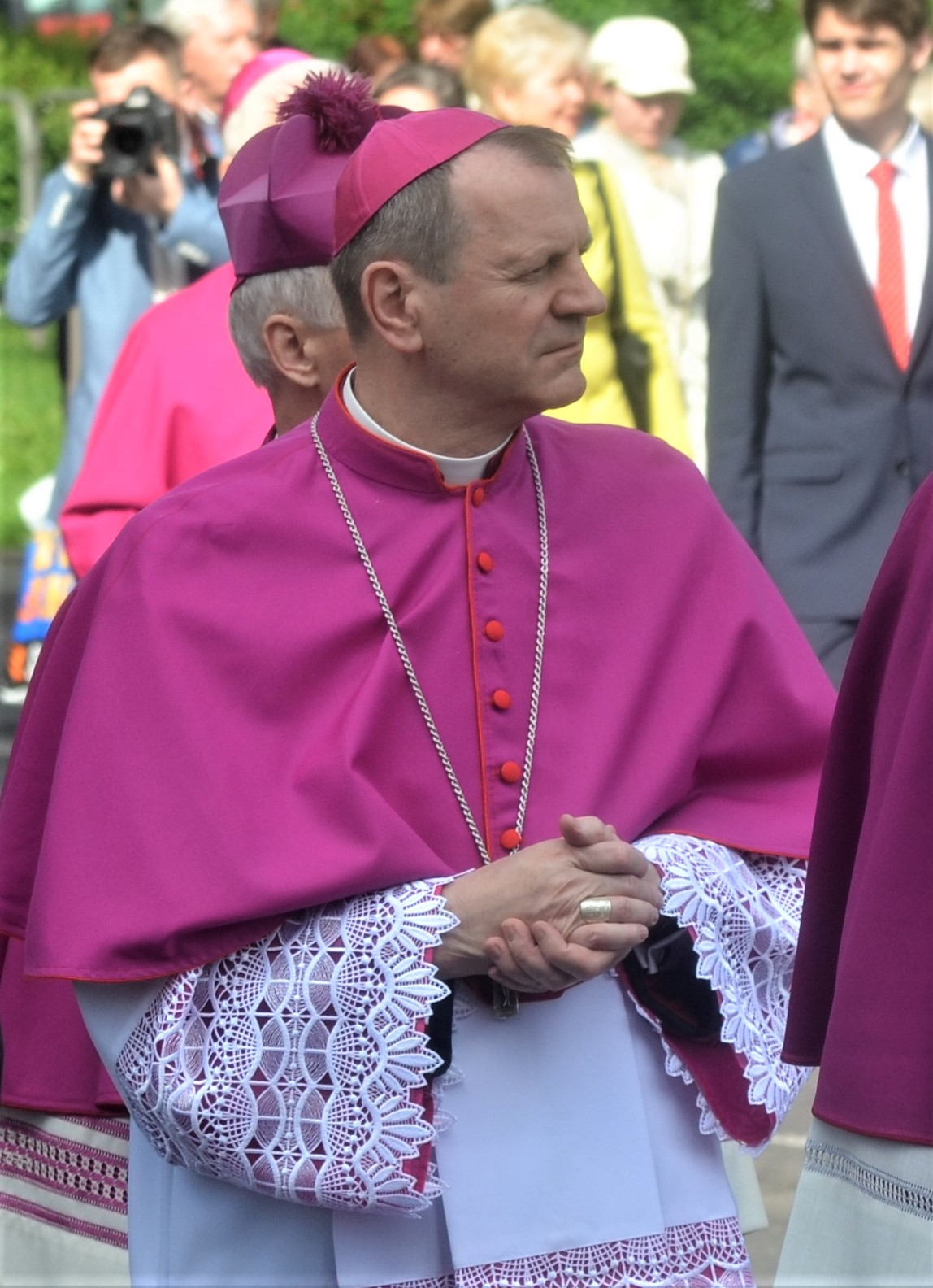
- Wojda pictured in May 2019.
- Church: Roman Catholic Church
- Archdiocese: Białystok
- Appointed: 2 March 2021
- Installed: 28 March 2021
- Predecessor: Edward Ozorowski
- Previous posts: Undersecretary of the Congregation for the Evangelization of Peoples (2012-2017); Archbishop of Białystok (2017-2021)

Orders
- Ordination: 8 May 1983 by Władysław Miziołek
- Consecration: 10 June 2017 by Fernando Filoni

Personal details
- Born: 29 January 1957 (age 69) Kowala, Kielce County, Poland
- Education: Cardinal Stefan Wyszyński University; Pontifical Gregorian University
- Motto: Oportet praedicari evangelium (English: That the Gospel may be proclaimed)
- Coat of arms

Tadeusz Wojda (born 29 January 1957) is a Polish prelate of the Catholic Church. He was archbishop of Białystok from 10 June 2017 until 2 March 2021, when he was named Archbishop of Gdansk. Since 14 March 2024, he has been president of the Polish Episcopal Conference.

== Biography ==
Born on 29 January 1957 in Kowala, Kielce County, Wojda entered the Pallottines in 1976 and was ordained a priest on 8 May 1983. He received a Licentiate from the Pontifical Gregorian University in 1986, and a PhD in 1989. From 1991, he served in a variety of roles in Congregation for the Evangelization of Peoples. He was appointed the Congregation's under-secretary on 24 July 2012.

On 12 April 2017, Pope Francis named him Archbishop of Białystok. and he was installed there on 10 June 2017.

Within the Episcopal Conference of Poland, he is a member of the Mission Committee and the Concordat Commission.

On 7 July 2019, ahead of the LGBT march scheduled to take place on 20 July, Wojda issued a non possumus proclamation to be read in all churches in Białystok and the entire Podlaskie Voivodeship. He called pride marches "blasphemy against God". He described the march as organized "by a foreign initiative in Podlaskie land and community, an area which is deeply rooted in Christianity and concerned about the good of its own society, especially children". Following the march, Wojda condemned the violence that occurred at the march as incompatible with Christianity and urged believers to pray for "the family and its internal purity".

On 2 March 2021, he was appointed archbishop of Gdańsk. He was formally installed as Archbishop on 28 March 2021.
