= Dziedzice, Masovian Voivodeship =

Dziedzice
- Village
- Location within Poland
- Coordinates: 52°40′39″N 19°52′10″E
- Country: Poland
- Voivodeship: Masovian
- County: Płock
- Gmina: Bielsk

Dziedzice [d͡ʑɛˈd͡ʑit͡sɛ] is a village in the administrative district of Gmina Bielsk, within Płock County, Masovian Voivodeship, in east-central Poland.
