= Bielsk, Masovian Voivodeship =

Bielsk
- Village
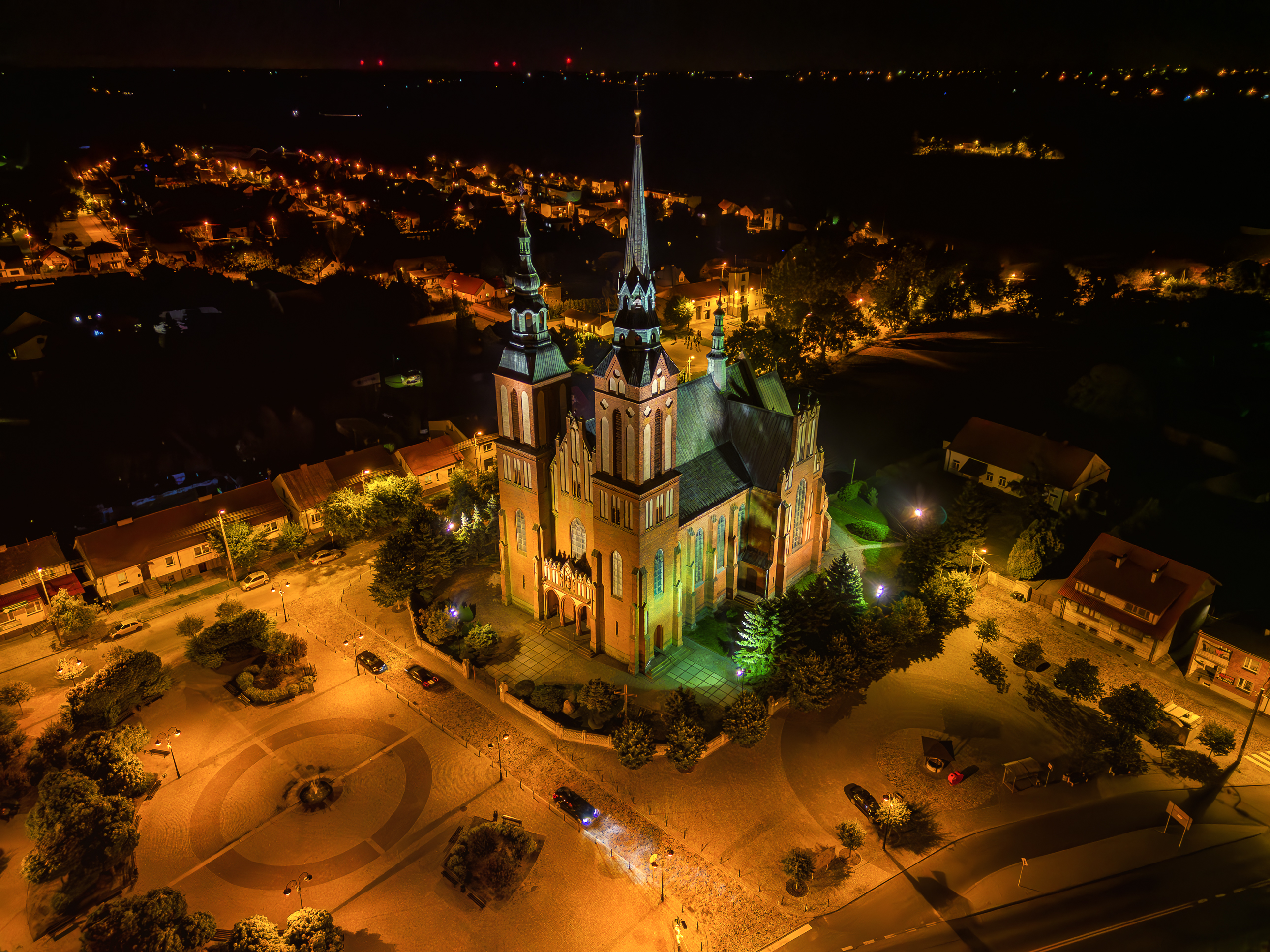
- Church of Saint John the Baptist

- Coat of arms

- Location within Poland
- Coordinates: 52°40′17″N 19°48′17″E
- Country: Poland
- Voivodeship: Masovian
- County: Płock
- Gmina: Bielsk

Population
  - Total: 2,770 (2,021)
- Time zone: UTC+1 (CET)
  - Summer (DST): UTC+2 (CEST)
- Vehicle registration: WPL

Bielsk [bjɛlsk] is a village in Płock County, Masovian Voivodeship, in central Poland. It is the seat of the gmina (administrative district) called Gmina Bielsk.

== History ==
Bielsk was granted Chełmno town rights in 1373. It was a royal town and county seat, administratively located in the Płock Voivodeship in the Greater Poland Province of the Kingdom of Poland.

== Sport ==
Bielsk is home to the amateur football club Ludowy Klub Sportowy (LKS) Zryw Bielsk, established in 1955. The club currently competes in the Klasa okręgowa, the 6th division.
