= Leszczyn Księży =

Village in Gmina Bielsk, Poland

- Village
- Location within Poland
- Coordinates: 52°38′00″N 19°51′00″E
- Country: Poland
- Voivodeship: Masovian
- County: Płock
- Gmina: Bielsk

Leszczyn Księży [ˈlɛʂt͡ʂɨn ˈkɕɛ̃ʐɨ] is a village in the administrative district of Gmina Bielsk, within Płock County, Masovian Voivodeship, in east-central Poland.
