= Żukowo, Płock County =

Żukowo
- Village
- Location within Poland
- Coordinates: 52°36′33″N 19°45′15″E
- Country: Poland
- Voivodeship: Masovian
- County: Płock
- Gmina: Bielsk

Żukowo [ʐuˈkɔvɔ] is a village in the administrative district of Gmina Bielsk, within Płock County, Masovian Voivodeship, in east-central Poland.
