= Sękowo =

Sękowo may refer to the following places:

- Sękowo, Nowy Tomyśl County in Greater Poland Voivodeship (west-central Poland)
- Sękowo, Szamotuły County in Greater Poland Voivodeship (west-central Poland)
- Sękowo, Masovian Voivodeship (east-central Poland)
- Sękowo, Warmian-Masurian Voivodeship (north Poland)
