= Ciachcin Nowy =

- Village
- Location within Poland
- Coordinates: 52°37′22″N 19°47′9″E
- Country: Poland
- Voivodeship: Masovian
- County: Płock
- Gmina: Bielsk
- Population: 280

Ciachcin Nowy [ˈt͡ɕaxt͡ɕin ˈnɔvɨ] is a village in the administrative district of Gmina Bielsk, within Płock County, Masovian Voivodeship, in east-central Poland.
