= Zakrzewo, Płock County =

Zakrzewo
- Village
- Location within Poland
- Coordinates: 52°41′N 19°49′E
- Country: Poland
- Voivodeship: Masovian
- County: Płock
- Gmina: Bielsk
- Population: 120

Zakrzewo [zaˈkʂɛvɔ] is a village in the administrative district of Gmina Bielsk, within Płock County, Masovian Voivodeship, in east-central Poland.
