= Pęszyno =

Village in Gmina Bielsk, Poland

- Village
- Location within Poland
- Coordinates: 52°40′59″N 19°41′44″E
- Country: Poland
- Voivodeship: Masovian
- County: Płock
- Gmina: Bielsk

Pęszyno [pɛ̃ˈʂɨnɔ] is a village in the administrative district of Gmina Bielsk, within Płock County, Masovian Voivodeship, in east-central Poland.
