= Gmina Nowiny =

Gmina Nowiny Nowiny Commune
- Gmina
- Flag Coat of arms
- Interactive map of Gmina Nowiny
- Coordinates (Nowiny): 50°49′1″N 20°33′0″E
- Country: Poland
- Voivodeship: Świętokrzyskie
- County: Kielce County
- Seat: Nowiny

Area
  - Total: 45.76 km^{2} (17.67 sq mi)

Population (2006)
  - Total: 6,983
  - Density: 152.6/km^{2} (395.2/sq mi)
- Website: http://www.nowiny.com.pl/

Gmina Nowiny (1973-2020: Gmina Sitkówka-Nowiny) is a rural gmina (administrative district) in Kielce County, Świętokrzyskie Voivodeship, in south-central Poland. Its seat is the village of Nowiny, which lies approximately 9 kilometres (6 mi) south-west of the regional capital Kielce.

The gmina covers an area of 45.76 square kilometres (17.7 sq mi), and as of 2006 its total population is 6,983.

The gmina contains part of the protected area called Chęciny-Kielce Landscape Park.

== Villages ==
Gmina Nowiny contains the villages and settlements of Bolechowice, Kowala, Nowiny, Sitkówka, Słowik, Szewce, Trzcianki, Wola Murowana, Zagrody, Zawada and Zgórsko.

== Neighbouring gminas ==
Gmina Nowiny is bordered by the city of Kielce and by the gminas of Chęciny, Morawica and Piekoszów.
