= Kleniewo, Masovian Voivodeship =

Kleniewo
- Village
- Location within Poland
- Coordinates: 52°39′00″N 19°52′00″E
- Country: Poland
- Voivodeship: Masovian
- County: Płock
- Gmina: Bielsk

Kleniewo [klɛˈɲɛvɔ] is a village in the administrative district of Gmina Bielsk, within Płock County, Masovian Voivodeship, in east-central Poland.
