= Konary, Płock County =

Konary
- Village
- Location within Poland
- Coordinates: 52°37′15″N 19°46′11″E
- Country: Poland
- Voivodeship: Masovian
- County: Płock
- Gmina: Bielsk

Konary [kɔˈnarɨ] is a village in the administrative district of Gmina Bielsk, within Płock County, Masovian Voivodeship, in east-central Poland.
