= Dębsk, Płock County =

Dębsk
- Village
- Location within Poland
- Coordinates: 52°42′N 19°49′E
- Country: Poland
- Voivodeship: Masovian
- County: Płock
- Gmina: Bielsk

Dębsk [dɛmpsk] is a village in the administrative district of Gmina Bielsk, within Płock County, Masovian Voivodeship, in east-central Poland.
