= Chęciny and Kielce Landscape Park =

Protected area in south-central Poland

Coordinates: 50.8056°N 20.3997°E

- Chęcińsko-Kielecki Park Krajobrazowy
- IUCN category V (protected landscape/seascape)
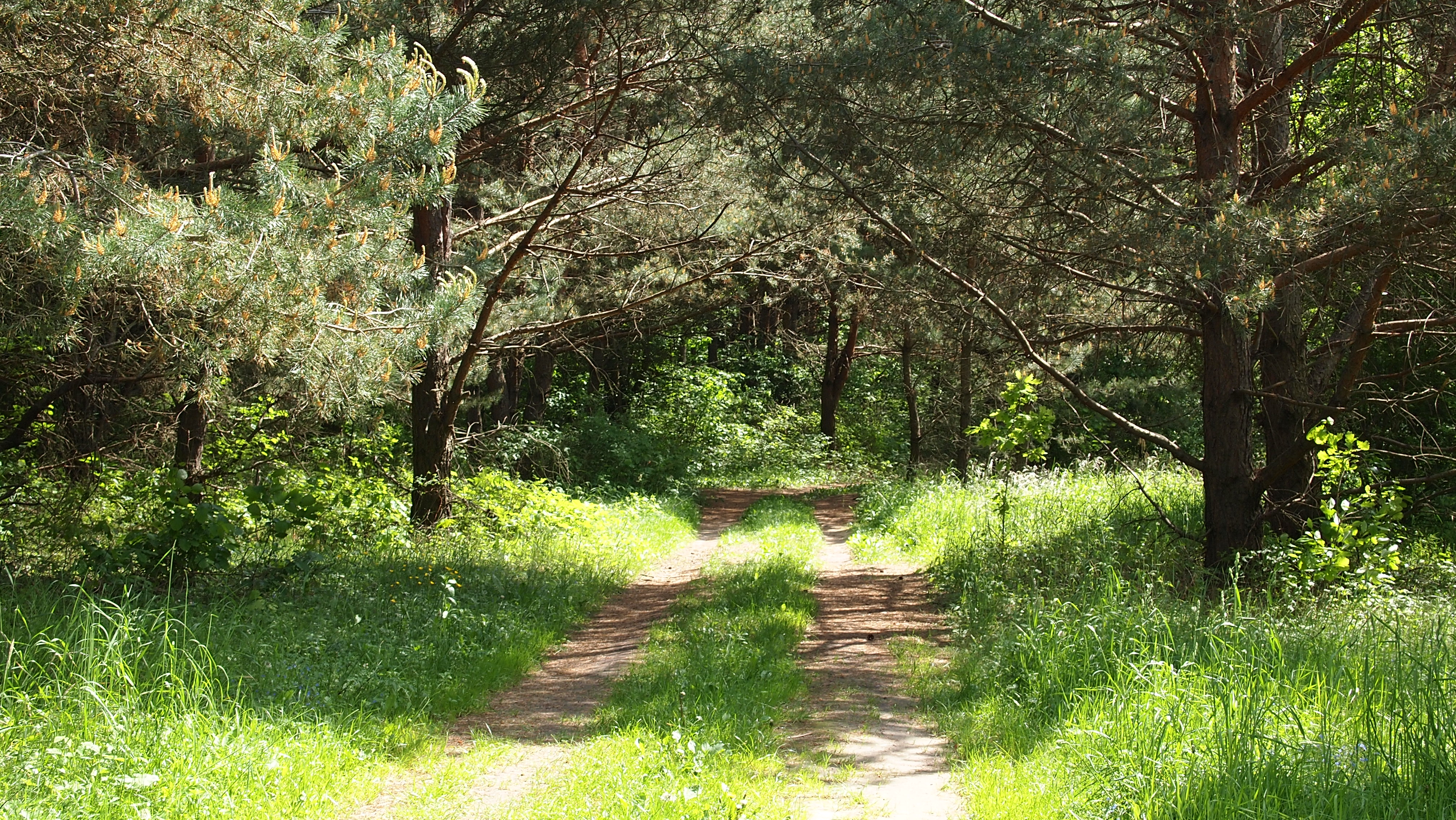
- Path in the park
- Interactive map of Chęciny and Kielce Landscape Park
- Location: Świętokrzyskie Voivodeship
- Area: 205.05 km^{2} (79.17 sq mi)
- Established: 1996

Chęciny and Kielce Landscape Park (Chęcińsko-Kielecki Park Krajobrazowy) is a protected area (Landscape Park) in south-central Poland, established in 1996, covering an area of 205.05 square kilometres (79.17 sq mi).

The Park lies within Świętokrzyskie Voivodeship: in Jędrzejów County (Gmina Małogoszcz, Gmina Sobków) and Kielce County (Gmina Chęciny, Gmina Piekoszów, Gmina Sitkówka-Nowiny).

Within the Landscape Park are seven nature reserves.
