= Trzcianki, Świętokrzyskie Voivodeship =

Trzcianki
- Village
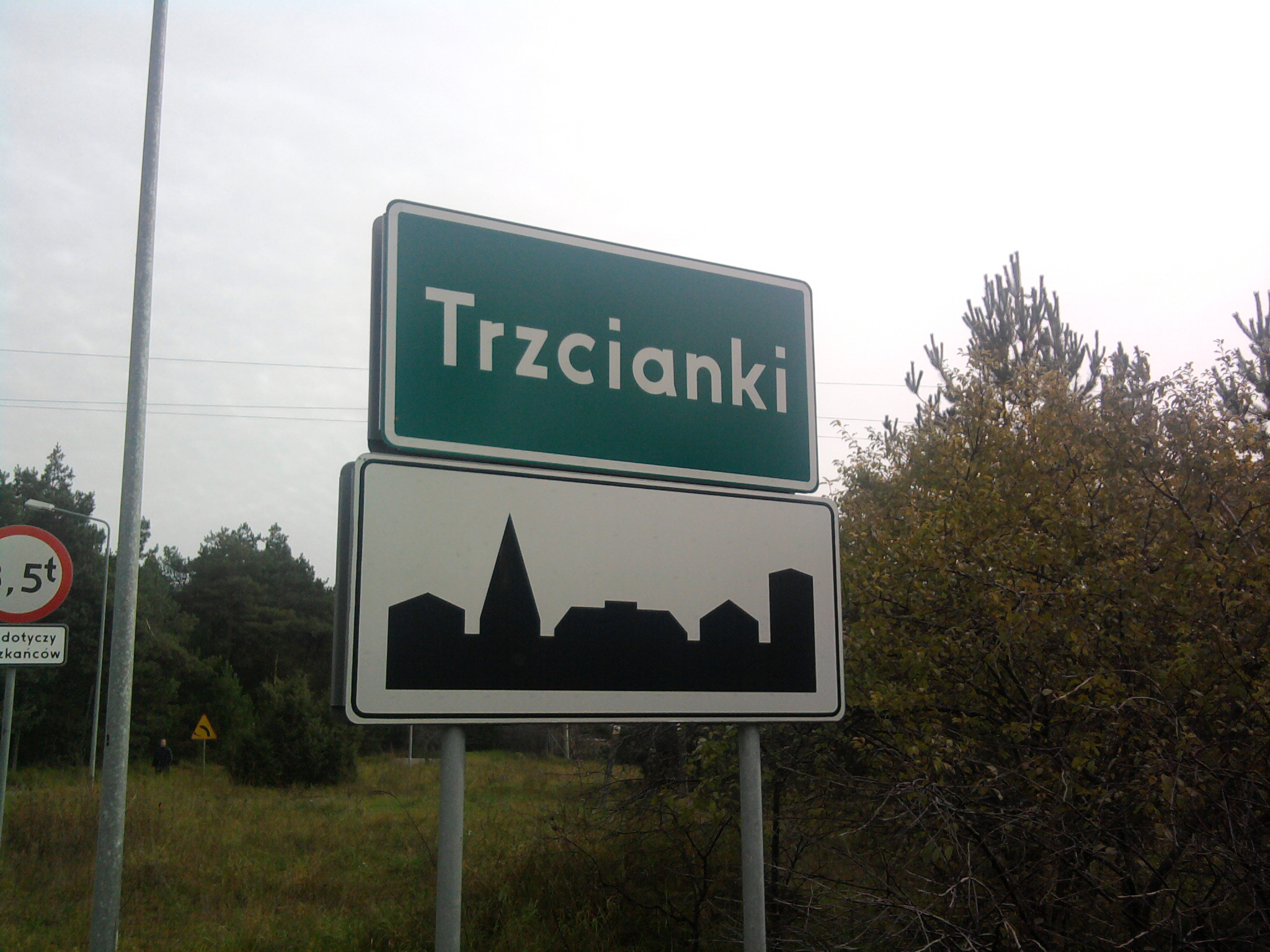

- Location within Poland
- Coordinates: 50°48′42″N 20°32′53″E
- Country: Poland
- Voivodeship: Świętokrzyskie
- County: Kielce
- Gmina: Sitkówka-Nowiny
- Population: 216

Trzcianki [ˈtʂt͡ɕaŋki] is a village in the administrative district of Gmina Sitkówka-Nowiny, within Kielce County, Świętokrzyskie Voivodeship, in south-central Poland. It lies approximately 1 km (1 mi) south of Osiedle-Nowiny and 10 km (6 mi) south-west of the regional capital Kielce.
