= Śmiłowo, Masovian Voivodeship =

Śmiłowo
- Village
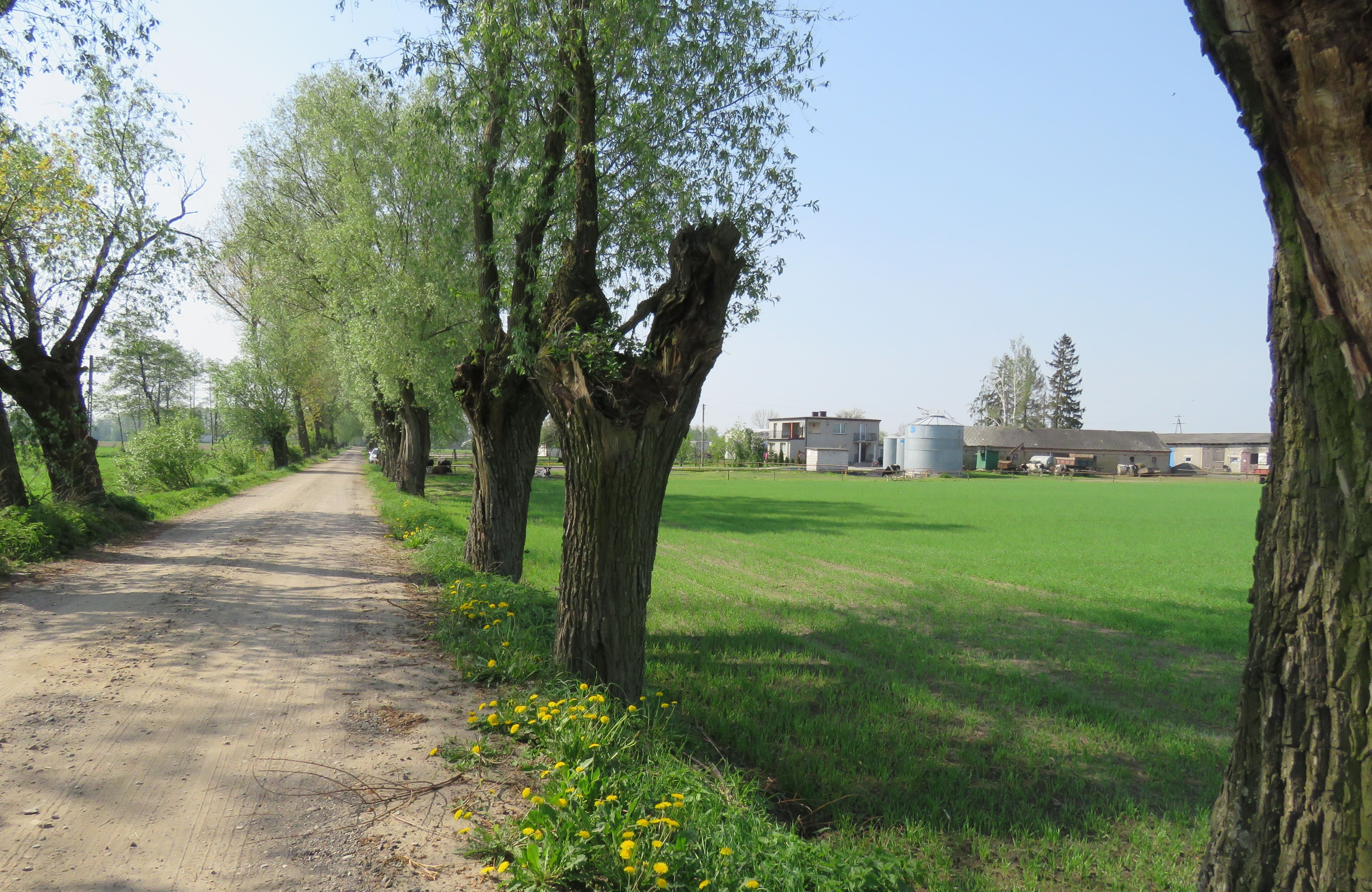

- Location within Poland
- Coordinates: 52°42′02″N 19°50′17″E
- Country: Poland
- Voivodeship: Masovian
- County: Płock
- Gmina: Bielsk

Śmiłowo [ɕmiˈwɔvɔ] is a village in the administrative district of Gmina Bielsk, within Płock County, Masovian Voivodeship, in east-central Poland.
