= Bolechowice, Świętokrzyskie Voivodeship =

Bolechowice
- Village
- Location within Poland
- Coordinates: 50°48′32″N 20°30′14″E
- Country: Poland
- Voivodeship: Świętokrzyskie
- County: Kielce
- Gmina: Sitkówka-Nowiny
- Population: 545

Bolechowice [bɔlɛxɔˈvit͡sɛ] is a village in the administrative district of Gmina Sitkówka-Nowiny, within Kielce County, Świętokrzyskie Voivodeship, in south-central Poland. It lies approximately 4 km (2 mi) west of Osiedle-Nowiny and 12 km (7 mi) south-west of the regional capital Kielce.
