= Kędzierzyn, Masovian Voivodeship =

Kędzierzyn
- Village
- Location within Poland
- Coordinates: 52°41′52″N 19°43′52″E
- Country: Poland
- Voivodeship: Masovian
- County: Płock
- Gmina: Bielsk

Kędzierzyn [kɛnˈd͡ʑɛʐɨn] is a village in the administrative district of Gmina Bielsk, within Płock County, Masovian Voivodeship, in east-central Poland.
