= Rudowo, Płock County =

Rudowo
- Village
- Location within Poland
- Coordinates: 52°39′36″N 19°50′42″E
- Country: Poland
- Voivodeship: Masovian
- County: Płock
- Gmina: Bielsk

Rudowo [ruˈdɔvɔ] is a village in the administrative district of Gmina Bielsk, within Płock County, Masovian Voivodeship, in east-central Poland.
