= Szewce, Gdańsk =

Szewce
- Settlement
- Location within Poland
- Coordinates: 54°17′22″N 18°55′30″E
- Country: Poland
- Voivodeship: Pomeranian
- City: Gdańsk
- District: Wyspa Sobieszewska

Szewce (Polish pronunciation: [ˈʂɛftsɛ]) is a settlement within Gdańsk, Pomeranian Voivodeship, in northern Poland. It lies approximately 7 kilometres (4 mi) north-east of Cedry Wielkie, 19 km (12 mi) east of Pruszcz Gdański, and 21 km (13 mi) south-east of the regional capital Gdańsk.

For details of the history of the region, see History of Pomerania.
