= Cekanowo, Gmina Bielsk =

Cekanowo
- Village
- Location within Poland
- Coordinates: 52°40′26″N 19°46′40″E
- Country: Poland
- Voivodeship: Masovian
- County: Płock
- Gmina: Bielsk

Cekanowo [t͡sɛkaˈnɔvɔ] is a village in the administrative district of Gmina Bielsk, within Płock County, Masovian Voivodeship, in east-central Poland.
