= Szewce, Masovian Voivodeship =

Szewce
- Village
- Location within Poland
- Coordinates: 52°42′N 19°51′E
- Country: Poland
- Voivodeship: Masovian
- County: Płock
- Gmina: Bielsk

Szewce [ˈʂɛft͡sɛ] is a village in the administrative district of Gmina Bielsk, within Płock County, Masovian Voivodeship, in east-central Poland.
