= Bobby Slowik =

American football player and coach (born 1987)

Miami Dolphins
- Title: Offensive coordinator

Personal information
- Born: June 9, 1987 (age 39); Princeton, New Jersey, U.S.

Career information
- Position: Wide receiver
- High school: Green Bay Southwest (Green Bay, Wisconsin)
- College: Michigan Tech (2005–2009)

Career history
- Washington Redskins (2011–2013) Defensive assistant; San Francisco 49ers (2017–2022); Defensive quality control coach (2017–2018); Offensive assistant (2019–2020); Offensive pass game specialist (2021); Offensive passing game coordinator (2022); Houston Texans (2023–2024) Offensive coordinator; Miami Dolphins (2025–present); Senior passing game coordinator (2025); Offensive coordinator (2026–present)
- Coaching profile at Pro Football Reference

Bobby Slowik (born June 9, 1987) is an American professional football coach who is the offensive coordinator for the Miami Dolphins of the National Football League (NFL). He previously served as an assistant coach for the Washington Redskins, San Francisco 49ers and Houston Texans.

== Playing career ==
Bobby Slowik attended Michigan Tech University and played wide receiver for the Huskies in 2006, 2007, and 2008. Slowik started 10 games at wide receiver in 2008, recording 43 receptions for 603 yards and 4 touchdowns.

== Coaching career ==
=== Washington Redskins ===
After spending the 2010 season as a video assistant, Slowik accepted his first NFL coaching position as a defensive assistant with the Washington Redskins in 2011 under head coach Mike Shanahan. Slowik remained on the coaching staff as a defensive assistant through the 2013 NFL season, after which Mike Shanahan was fired and Slowik was not retained.

=== Pro Football Focus ===
Following his stint with the Redskins, Slowik spent 2014 through 2016 as an analyst with sports analytics company Pro Football Focus. Slowik worked as a senior analyst at PFF, responsible for grading NFL players and reviewing the grading of other analysts.

=== San Francisco 49ers ===
Following that stint, Slowik joined the San Francisco 49ers as a defensive quality control coach under head coach Kyle Shanahan in 2017 and 2018. For the 2019 and 2020 NFL seasons, however, Slowik moved to the offensive side of the ball as an offensive assistant. In 2021, upon the departure of offensive passing game coordinator Mike LaFleur, Slowik took on new responsibilities as the offensive passing game specialist. In 2022, Slowik was promoted to offensive passing game coordinator.

=== Houston Texans ===
Slowik was hired as the offensive coordinator for the Houston Texans on February 12, 2023, by new head coach DeMeco Ryans, who Slowik had previously worked with in San Francisco. Slowik was part of the staff that led the Texans to a 10–7 regular season finish, the AFC South title, and a Wild Card Round victory over the Cleveland Browns. On January 30, 2024, Slowik signed with the Texans for another year going into the 2024 season. He was fired on January 24, 2025. The Texans finished the 2024 season 22nd in yards per game and 19th in points per game.

=== Miami Dolphins ===
On February 11, 2025, the Miami Dolphins hired Slowik to serve as the team's senior passing game coordinator. Following the dismissal of Mike McDaniel at the conclusion of the 2025 season, and the hiring of head coach Jeff Hafley, Slowik was promoted by Hafley to offensive coordinator for the 2026 season.

== Personal life ==
Slowik’s mother is coach Carol Thomson Slowik.

His father is Bob Slowik, who is the defensive coordinator for the Calgary Stampeders of the CFL and previously served as the defensive coordinator of the Chicago Bears, Cleveland Browns, Green Bay Packers, and Denver Broncos in the NFL and the Montreal Alouettes of the CFL.

His older brother is Ryan Slowik, who currently works for the New York Jets, as the team's safeties coach.

His younger brother is Steve Slowik, who currently works for the 49ers, as a pro scout.
