= Słowik, Świętokrzyskie Voivodeship =

Słowik
- Village
- Location within Poland
- Coordinates: 50°50′8″N 20°32′24″E
- Country: Poland
- Voivodeship: Świętokrzyskie
- County: Kielce
- Gmina: Sitkówka-Nowiny
- Population: 98

Słowik [ˈswɔvik] is a village in the administrative district of Gmina Sitkówka-Nowiny, within Kielce County, Świętokrzyskie Voivodeship, in south-central Poland. It lies approximately 3 km (2 mi) north of Osiedle-Nowiny and 8 km (5 mi) south-west of the regional capital Kielce.
