= Giżyno, Masovian Voivodeship =

Giżyno
- Village
- Location within Poland
- Coordinates: 53°20′N 15°56′E
- Country: Poland
- Voivodeship: West Pomeranian
- County: Drawsko
- Gmina: Kalisz Pomorski

Giżyno [ɡiˈʐɨnɔ] (German: Glesen) is a village in the administrative district of Gmina Kalisz Pomorski, within Drawsko County, Zachodnio-Pomorskie Voivodeship, in north-western Poland.

For the history of the region, see History of Pomerania.
