= Bolechowice, Masovian Voivodeship =

Bolechowice
- Village
- Location within Poland
- Coordinates: 52°39′38″N 19°46′29″E
- Country: Poland
- Voivodeship: Masovian
- County: Płock
- Gmina: Bielsk

Bolechowice [bɔlɛxɔˈvit͡sɛ] is a village in the administrative district of Gmina Bielsk, within Płock County, Masovian Voivodeship, in east-central Poland.
