= Leszczyn Szlachecki =

- Village
- Location within Poland
- Coordinates: 52°37′00″N 19°49′00″E
- Country: Poland
- Voivodeship: Masovian
- County: Płock
- Gmina: Bielsk

Leszczyn Szlachecki (Polish pronunciation: [ˈlɛʂtʂɨn ʂlaˈxɛtskʲi]) is a village in the administrative district of Gmina Bielsk, within Płock County, Masovian Voivodeship, in east-central Poland.
