= Ciachcin =

- Village
- Location within Poland
- Coordinates: 52°37′18″N 19°48′19″E
- Country: Poland
- Voivodeship: Masovian
- County: Płock
- Gmina: Bielsk
- Population: 170

Ciachcin [ˈt͡ɕaxt͡ɕin] is a village in the administrative district of Gmina Bielsk, within Płock County, Masovian Voivodeship, in east-central Poland.
