= Carol Thomson Slowik =

American college track and field coach

Playing career
- c. 1976: Delaware
- Position: Hurdles

Coaching career (HC unless noted)
- 1980–1982: Florida

Caroline A. "Carol" Thomson Slowik (born 12 April 1952) is an American college track and field coach and former hurdler.

== Hurdler ==
The University of Delaware did not field an official track team before 1979. However, Carol represented the University before that. In 1976-1977 her ranking was second worldwide in 50-meter hurdles. She also held a world record in the 60-yard hurdles and an American record in the 50 and 60-metre indoor hurdles, as well as being a national collegiate champion in the 100-meter hurdles.

== Coach ==
Carol coached at the University of Florida, Drake University, Rutgers University, and East Carolina University, and twice was assistant coach of the U.S. Olympic Festival team.

== Honors ==
Carol received AIAW All-American honors in 1976-77.

In 1994 she was inducted into the Delaware Track & Field Hall of Fame.

In 1995 she was inducted into the Delaware Sports Hall of Fame.

== Personal life ==
Her husband is Bob Slowik, a coach in the Canadian Football League. Their son is Bobby Slowik, a coach in the National Football League.
