= Slavik =

Slavik is a surname and given name. In Czech and Slovak, it means "nightingale". In other countries, it is sometimes a diminutive of Vyacheslav or similar given names.

== Surname ==
=== Slavík ===
Slavík (feminine: Slavíková) is a surname meaning "nightingale" in Czech.

- František Slavík, Czech slalom canoeist
- František Slavík (athlete) (1888–1926), Czech athlete
- Josef Slavík (1806–1833), Czech violinist and composer
- Martin Slavík (born 1979), Czech footballer
- Otakar Slavík (1931–2010), Czech painter
- Tomáš Slavík (born 1981), Czech skier
- Tomáš Slavík (cyclist) (born 1987), Czech mountain biker
- Václav Slavík (1906–unknown), Czech architect

=== Slávik ===
Slávik (feminine: Sláviková) is a surname meaning "nightingale" in Slovak.

- Adrián Slávik (born 1999), Slovak footballer
- Jaroslav Slávik (born 1976), Slovak luger
- Matej Slávik (born 1994), Slovak footballer
- Robert Slávik (born 1974), Czech ice hockey player

=== Slavik ===
- Yuriy Slavik (born 1989), Ukrainian footballer

=== Slavick ===
- Madeleine Marie Slavick, American author and photographer

== Given name ==
- Slavik Alkhasov (born 1993), Azerbaijani footballer
- Slavik Galstyan (born 1996), Armenian wrestler
- Slavik Kryklyvyy (born 1976), Ukrainian ballroom dancer
- Slavik Tabakov, British-Bulgarian medical physicist

== Name ==
- Slavik, a French decorator of Le Drugstore in Paris that inspired Chelsea Drugstore

== See also ==
- Český slavík, Czech music awards
- Slávik Awards, Slovak music awards
- Zlatý slavík, Czechoslovak music awards
