= Bob Slowik =

American football coach (born 1954)

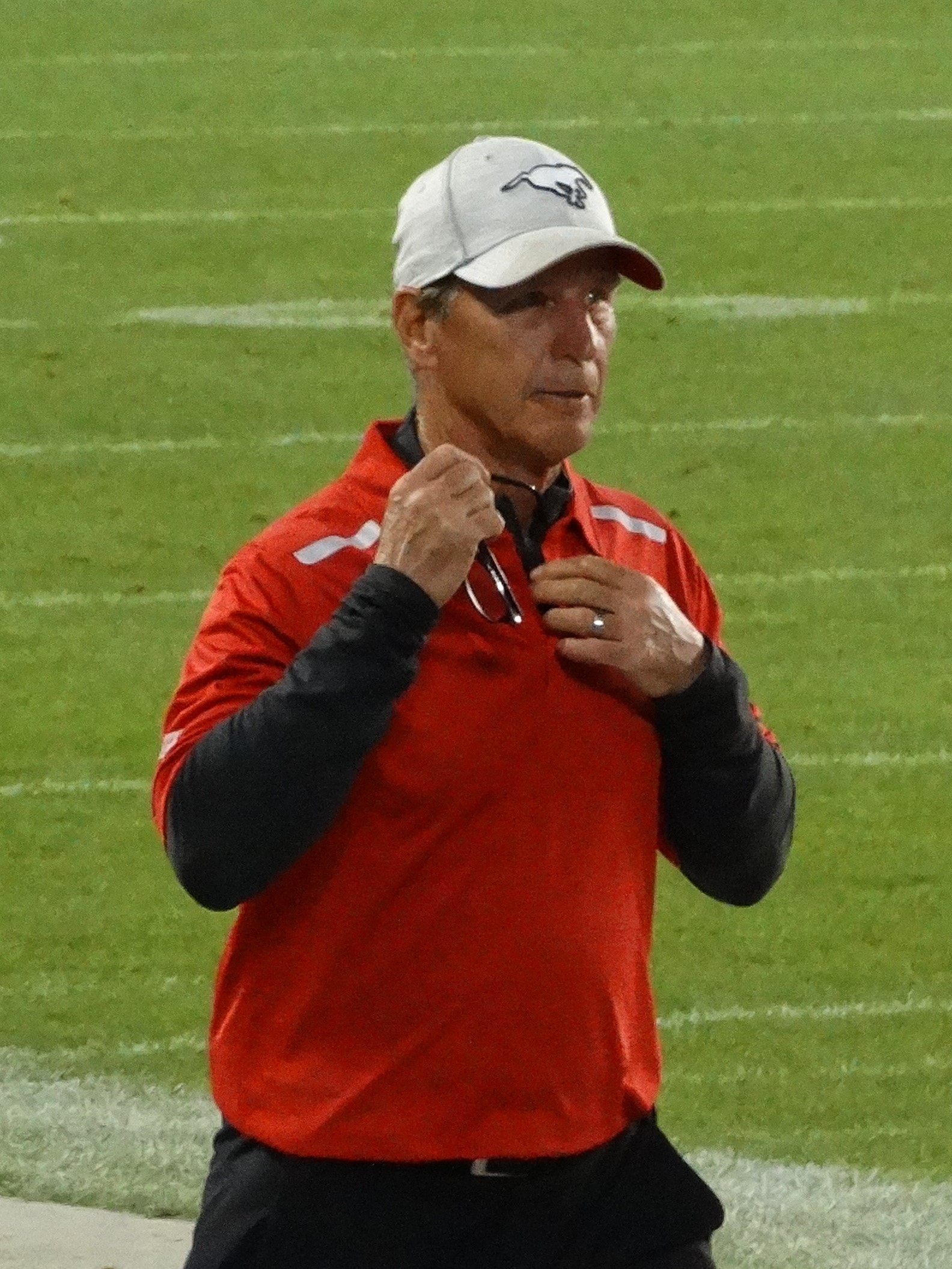
- Slowik with the Calgary Stampeders in 2022

Calgary Stampeders
- Title: Defensive coordinator

Personal information
- Born: May 16, 1954 (age 72)

Career information
- Position: Cornerback
- College: Delaware

Career history
- Rutgers (1984–1989) Secondary coach; East Carolina (1990–1991) Outside linebackers coach; Dallas Cowboys (1992) Defensive assistant; Chicago Bears (1993–1998) Defensive coordinator; Cleveland Browns (1999) Defensive coordinator; Green Bay Packers (2000–2004); Defensive backs coach (2000–2003); Defensive coordinator (2004); Denver Broncos (2005–2008); Defensive backs coach (2005–2006); Defensive coordinator (2007–2008); Washington Redskins (2010–2013); Defensive backs coach (2010–2011); Linebackers coach (2012–2013); Montreal Alouettes (2019–2020) Defensive coordinator; Calgary Stampeders (2021–present); Defensive assistant (2021); Linebackers coach (2022–2024); Defensive coordinator (2025–present)

Awards and highlights
- Super Bowl champion (XXVII)
- Coaching profile at Pro Football Reference

Robert Slowik (born May 16, 1954) is a gridiron football coach who is the defensive coordinator for the Calgary Stampeders of the Canadian Football League (CFL).

== College career ==
Slowik played college football at the University of Delaware, where he was a two-year starter at cornerback prior to beginning his coaching career there as a graduate assistant.

== Coaching career ==
Slowik was a defensive coordinator for the Denver Broncos, Green Bay Packers, Cleveland Browns and Chicago Bears in the National Football League (NFL) and for the Montreal Alouettes in the CFL. He has also been a coach for Rutgers, East Carolina University, and the Dallas Cowboys.

It was announced that Slowik had joined the Calgary Stampeders as a defensive assistant on June 17, 2021. In the following season, he was named the team's linebackers coach. He served in that capacity for three seasons before being promoted to defensive coordinator on December 16, 2024.

== Personal life ==
Bob Slowik is the husband of coach Carol Thomson Slowik.

Their son, Bobby Slowik, was the offensive coordinator for the Houston Texans of the National Football League (NFL) for 2 seasons.
