= Nowiny, Kielce County =

Nowiny
- Village
- Coat of arms

- Location within Poland
- Coordinates: 50°49′1″N 20°33′0″E
- Country: Poland
- Voivodeship: Świętokrzyskie
- County: Kielce
- Gmina: Sitkówka-Nowiny
- Population: 2,542

Nowiny [nɔˈvinɨ] is a village in Kielce County, Świętokrzyskie Voivodeship, in south-central Poland. It is the seat of the gmina (administrative district) called Gmina Sitkówka-Nowiny. It lies approximately 9 km (6 mi) south-west of the regional capital Kielce.
