= Piekoszów =

- Town
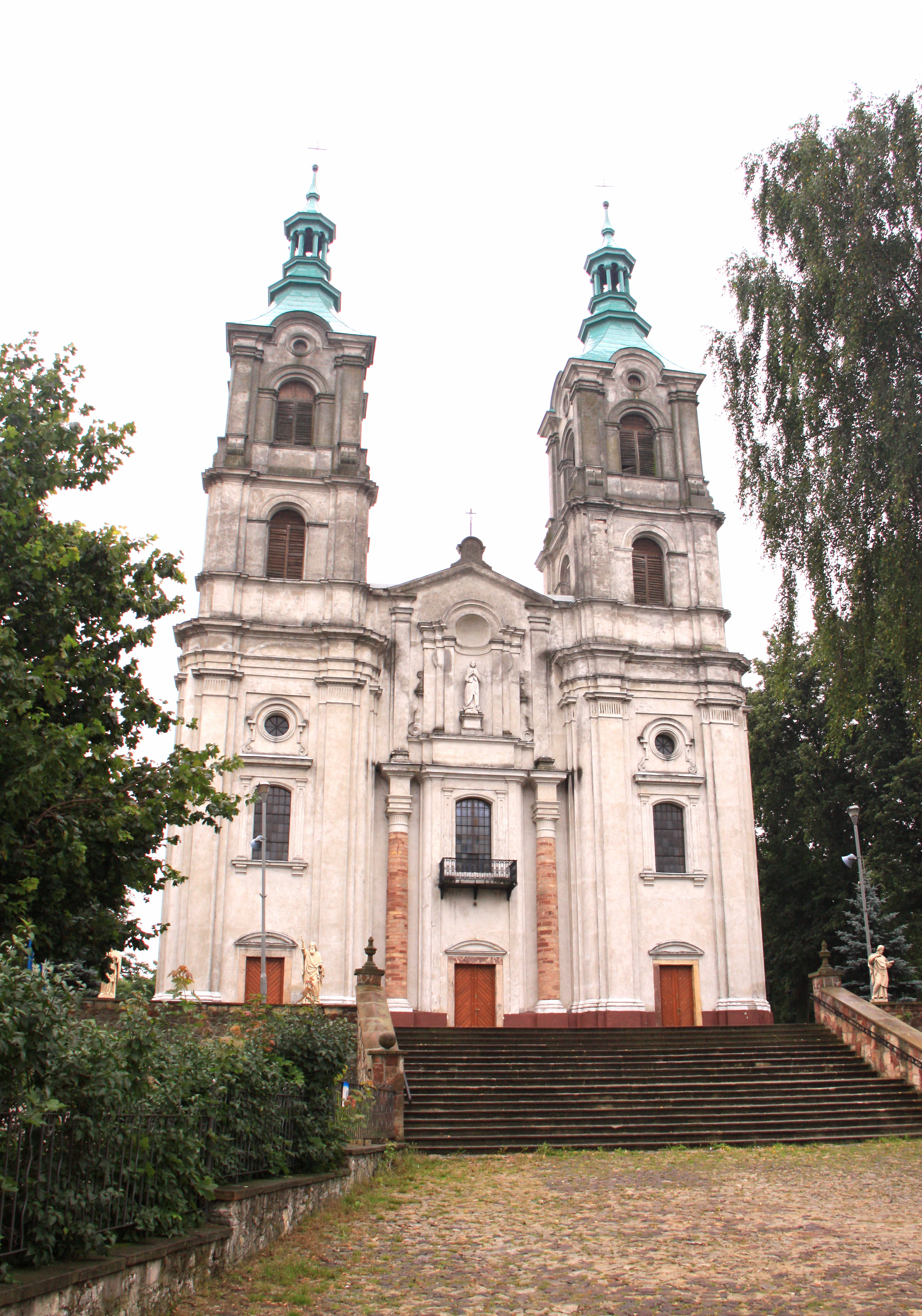
- Church of the Nativity of the Virgin Mary in Piekoszów

- Coat of arms

- Location within Poland
- Coordinates: 50°52′54″N 20°27′42″E
- Country: Poland
- Voivodeship: Świętokrzyskie
- County: Kielce
- Gmina: Piekoszów

Population
  - Total: 3,200
- Time zone: UTC+1 (CET)
  - Summer (DST): UTC+2 (CEST)
- Postal code: 26-065
- Area code: +48 41
- Vehicle registration: TKI
- Website: http://www.piekoszow.pl

Piekoszów [pjɛˈkɔʂuf] is a town in Kielce County, Świętokrzyskie Voivodeship, in south-central Poland. It is the seat of the gmina (administrative district) called Gmina Piekoszów. It lies approximately 11 km (7 mi) west of the regional capital Kielce.

== History ==
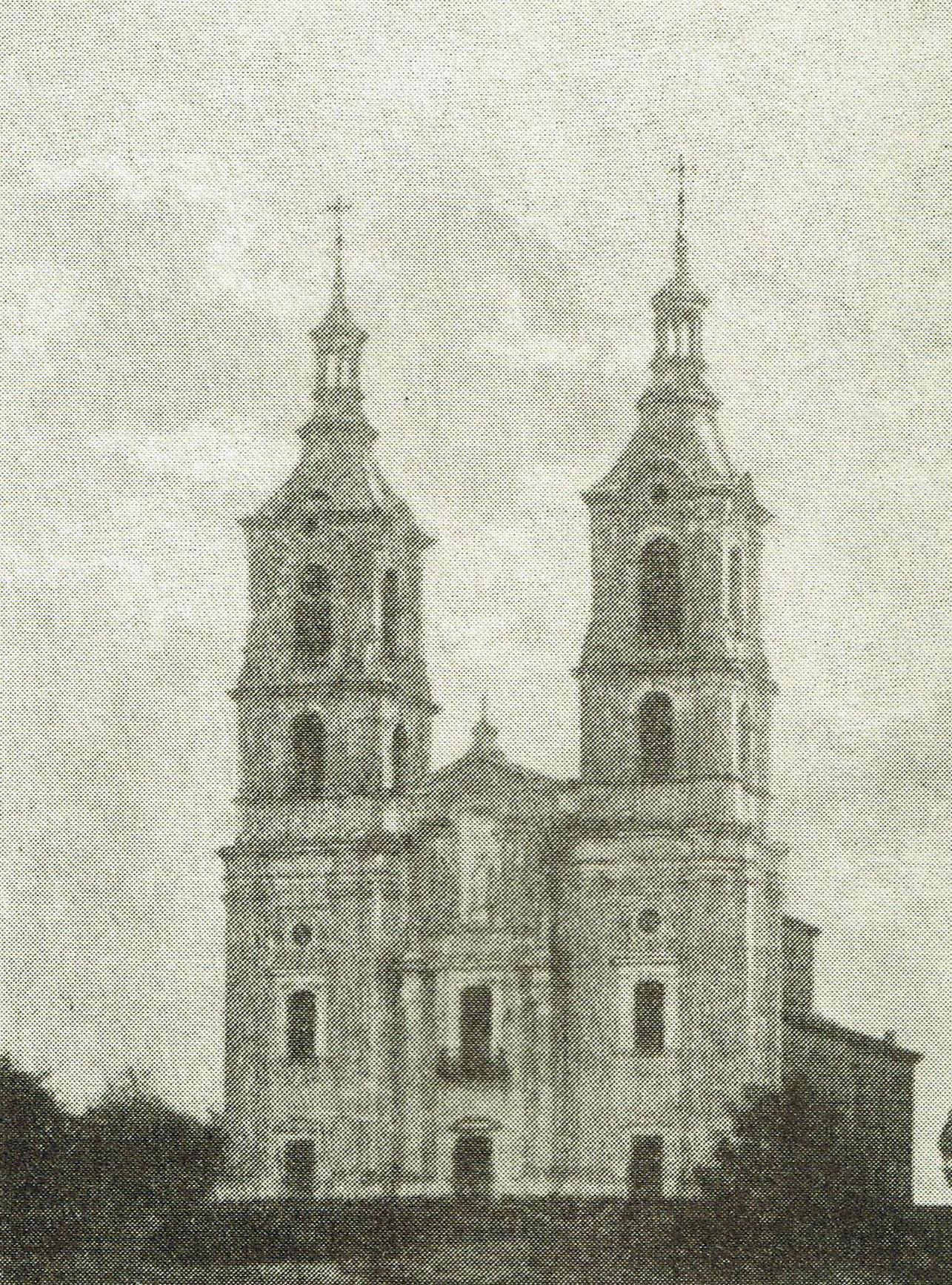
Early-20th-century view of the Church of the Nativity of the Virgin Mary

Piekoszów was the former seat of the Odrowąż family. In 1366, Piotr Odrowąż founded a parish church in Piekoszów. It was administratively located in the Sandomierz Voivodeship in the Lesser Poland Province of the Kingdom of Poland.

According to the 1921 census, the population was 94.4% Polish and 5.6% Jewish.

Following the German-Soviet invasion of Poland, which started World War II in September 1939, the town was occupied by Germany.
