= Gmina Wałcz =

Gmina Wałcz Wałcz Commune
- Gmina
- Coat of arms
- Interactive map of Gmina Wałcz
- Coordinates (Wałcz): 53°16′N 16°28′E
- Country: Poland
- Voivodeship: West Pomeranian
- County: Wałcz
- Seat: Wałcz

Area
  - Total: 575.09 km^{2} (222.04 sq mi)

Population (2006)
  - Total: 12,424
  - Density: 21.604/km^{2} (55.953/sq mi)
- Website: http://www.walcz.ug.gov.pl/

Gmina Wałcz is a rural gmina (administrative district) in Wałcz County, West Pomeranian Voivodeship, in north-western Poland. Its seat is the town of Wałcz, although the town is not part of the territory of the gmina.

The gmina covers an area of 575.09 square kilometres (222.0 sq mi) making it second largest in country. As of 2006 its total population is 12,424.

== Villages ==
Gmina Wałcz contains the villages and settlements of Boguszyn, Brzezinki, Bukowa Góra, Chude, Chwiram, Czapla, Czechyń, Czepiec, Dębołęka, Dobino, Dobrogoszcz, Dobrzyca, Dobrzyca Leśna, Dzikowo, Glinki, Głowaczewo, Golce, Górnica, Gostomia, Iłowiec, Jarogniewie, Jeziorko, Karsibór, Kłębowiec, Kłosowo, Kołatnik, Kolno, Łąki, Laski Wałeckie, Lipie, Lubno, Ługi Wałeckie, Morzyca, Nagórze, Nakielno, Nowa Szwecja, Olszynka, Omulno, Ostrowiec, Papowo, Piława, Pluskota, Popowo, Prusinówko, Prusinowo Wałeckie, Przybkowo, Różewo, Rudki, Rudnica, Rusinowo, Rutwica, Sitowo, Smoląg, Sosnówka, Strączno, Świętosław, Szwecja, Wałcz Drugi, Witankowo and Zdbice.

== Neighbouring gminas ==
Gmina Wałcz is bordered by the town of Wałcz and by the gminas of Czaplinek, Człopa, Jastrowie, Mirosławiec, Szydłowo, Trzcianka, Tuczno and Wierzchowo.
