= Dobrzyca, Wałcz County =

Dobrzyca
- Village
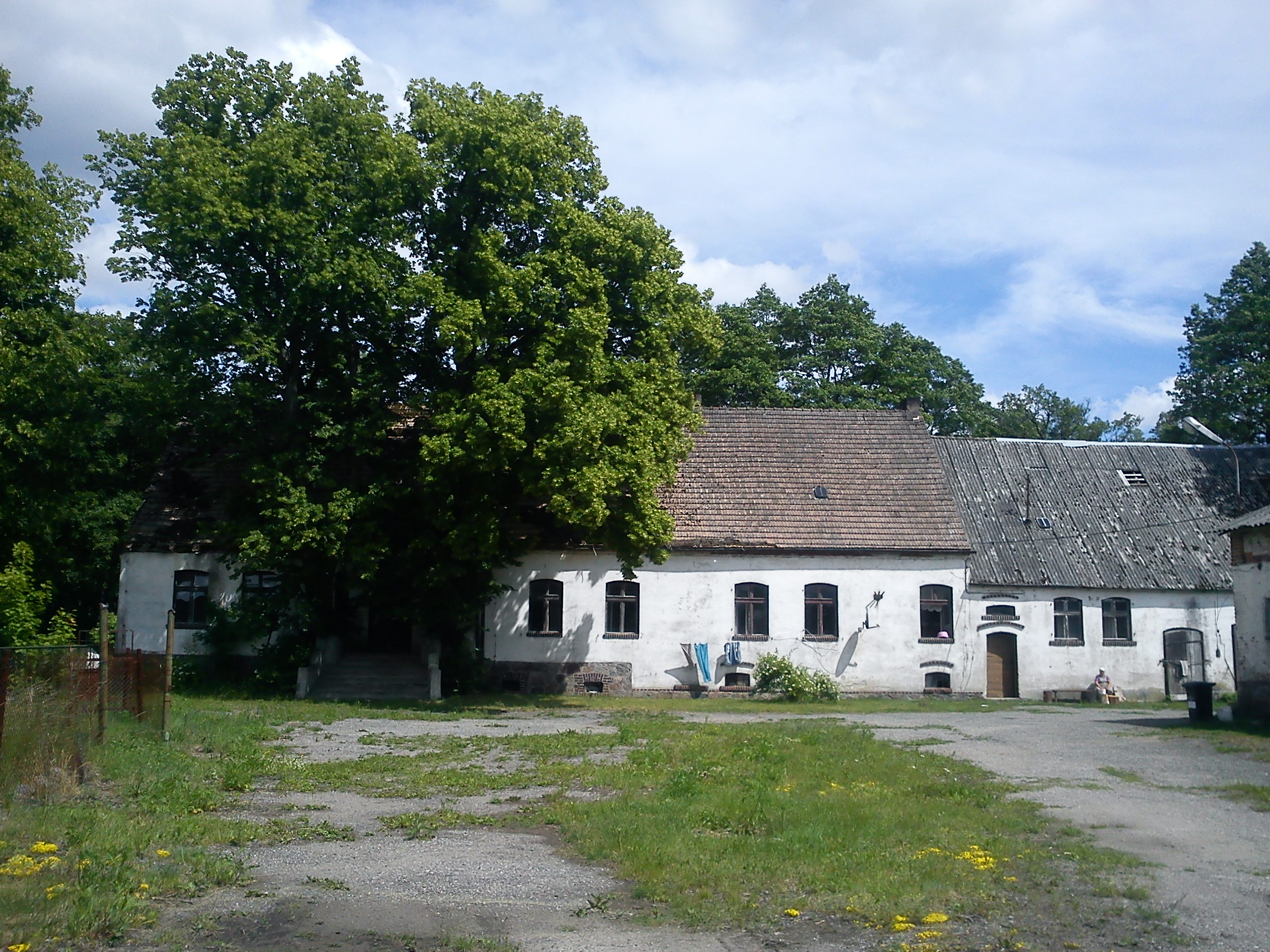
- Dobrzyca estate (Gut Döberitzfelde)

- Location within Poland
- Coordinates: 53°23′59″N 16°24′37″E
- Country: Poland
- Voivodeship: West Pomeranian
- County: Wałcz
- Gmina: Wałcz
- Population: 120−135
- Time zone: UTC+1 (CET)
  - Summer (DST): UTC+2 (CEST)
- Postal code: 78-607
- Vehicle registration: ZWA

Dobrzyca [dɔˈbʐɨt͡sa] (German: Döberitz) – is a part of the village of Rudki in Poland, located in the West Pomeranian Voivodeship, Wałcz County, in the administrative district of Gmina Wałcz, on the Dobrzyca River. It is part of the sołectwo (village administrative unit) of Rudki.

The village of Dobrzyca was established in the 1850s.

During the German Empire (1870–1914), Dobrzyca was part of West Prussia (German: Westpreußen), within the Marienwerder Region (today Kwidzyn). Administratively, it belonged to Deutsch Krone County (today Wałcz) and was under the jurisdiction of the civil registry office and municipal administration in Wissulka (today Wiesiółka).

It was classified as a Forstgutsbezirk, meaning a forest estate – a forested area managed independently of neighboring rural municipalities, often with its own forester in charge.

In the imperial period, the settlement had 55 inhabitants and included:

- Döberitz Forestry – 9.6 km from the nearest postal agency, with 6 inhabitants,
- Döberitz Forest Guardhouse – 7 inhabitants,
- Settlements and hamlets such as Hundsfier, Kronertier, Springberg, Babelsmühl, Zechendorf, and Plietnitz – each with populations ranging between 4 and 12.

During World War II, from 5 to 8 February 1945, the Battle of Dobrzyca took place here. It was one of the engagements during the breakthrough of the Pomeranian Wall, part of the Soviet and Polish 1st Army offensive towards the Oder River.

In the People’s Republic of Poland (PRL) period, a State Agricultural Farm (PGR) operated in Dobrzyca. It included cowsheds, a stable, and a smithy, all subordinate to the PGR Combine in Karsibór. In the later period, two apartment blocks were built for the employees of the farm. Until the 1990s, the village was officially called Dobrzyca Wielka.

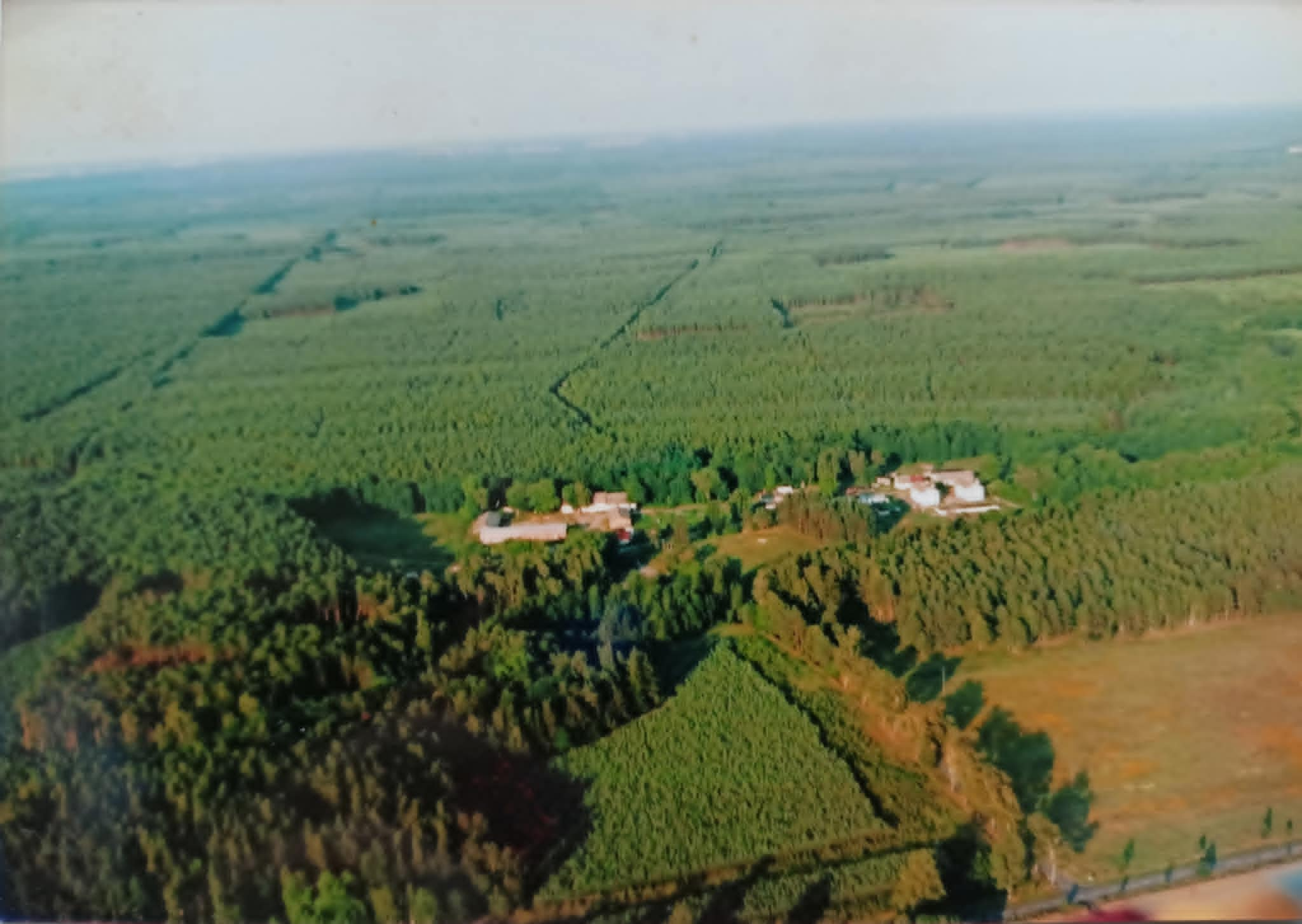
Dobrzyca from a bird’s eye view (2004)

From 1975 to 1998, the settlement administratively belonged to Piła Voivodeship.

Dobrzyca was the site of a manor house built in the 1850s. Between September and December 2016, it was demolished as it had become a derelict and ruined building.

The surrounding forests belong to the Wałcz Forest District (Nadleśnictwo Wałcz).

In September 2015, a new playground was built for the children of the village.

All inhabitants are adherents of Catholicism.

== Demography ==
Description	Total	Women	Men
unit	persons	persons	persons
population	120	69	51
%	100%	57,5%	42,5%

Data as of May 2017, based on the population census.
