= Czapla =

Czapla ("heron" in Polish) may refer to:

- Czapla, West Pomeranian Voivodeship, a village in north-western Poland
- Czapla (surname)
- RWD-14 Czapla
- SZD-10 Czapla
