= Zdbice =

- Village
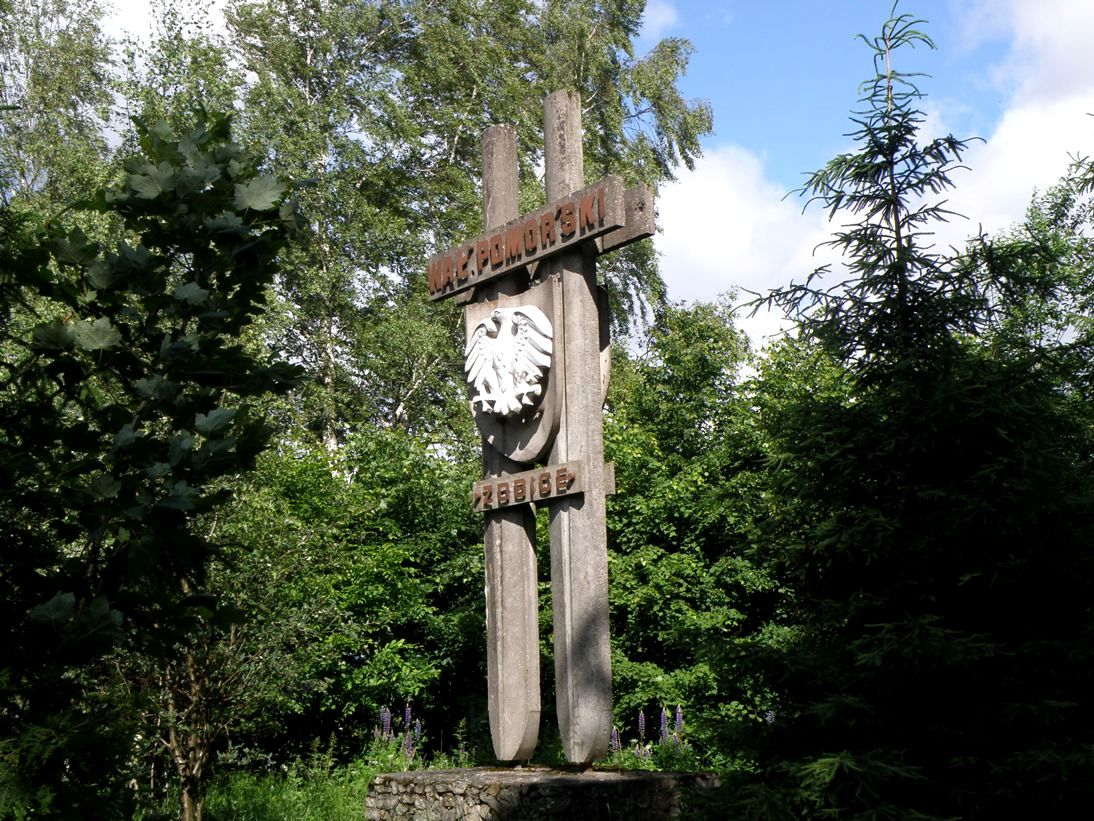
- Monument honoring the breaking of the Pomeranian Wall by the Polish army

- Location within Poland
- Coordinates: 53°23′N 16°30′E
- Country: Poland
- Voivodeship: West Pomeranian
- County: Wałcz
- Gmina: Wałcz

Population
  - Total: 150
- Time zone: UTC+1 (CET)
  - Summer (DST): UTC+2 (CEST)
- Vehicle registration: ZWA

Zdbice [ˈzdbit͡sɛ] (German: Stabitz) is a village in the administrative district of Gmina Wałcz, within Wałcz County, West Pomeranian Voivodeship, in north-western Poland. It lies approximately 14 km (9 mi) north of Wałcz and 128 km (80 mi) east of the regional capital Szczecin.

The village has a population of 150.

Zdbice are popular tourist destination for its large and clean lake, excluded cape with summer houses build on it, old German Nazi fortifications and forests.
