= Gostomia, West Pomeranian Voivodeship =

Gostomia
- Village
- Location within Poland
- Coordinates: 53°11′N 16°25′E
- Country: Poland
- Voivodeship: West Pomeranian
- County: Wałcz
- Gmina: Wałcz

Gostomia [ɡɔsˈtɔmja] (German: Arnsfelde) is a village in the administrative district of Gmina Wałcz, within Wałcz County, West Pomeranian Voivodeship, in north-western Poland. It lies approximately 10 km (6 mi) south of Wałcz and 125 km (78 mi) east of the regional capital Szczecin.

== History ==
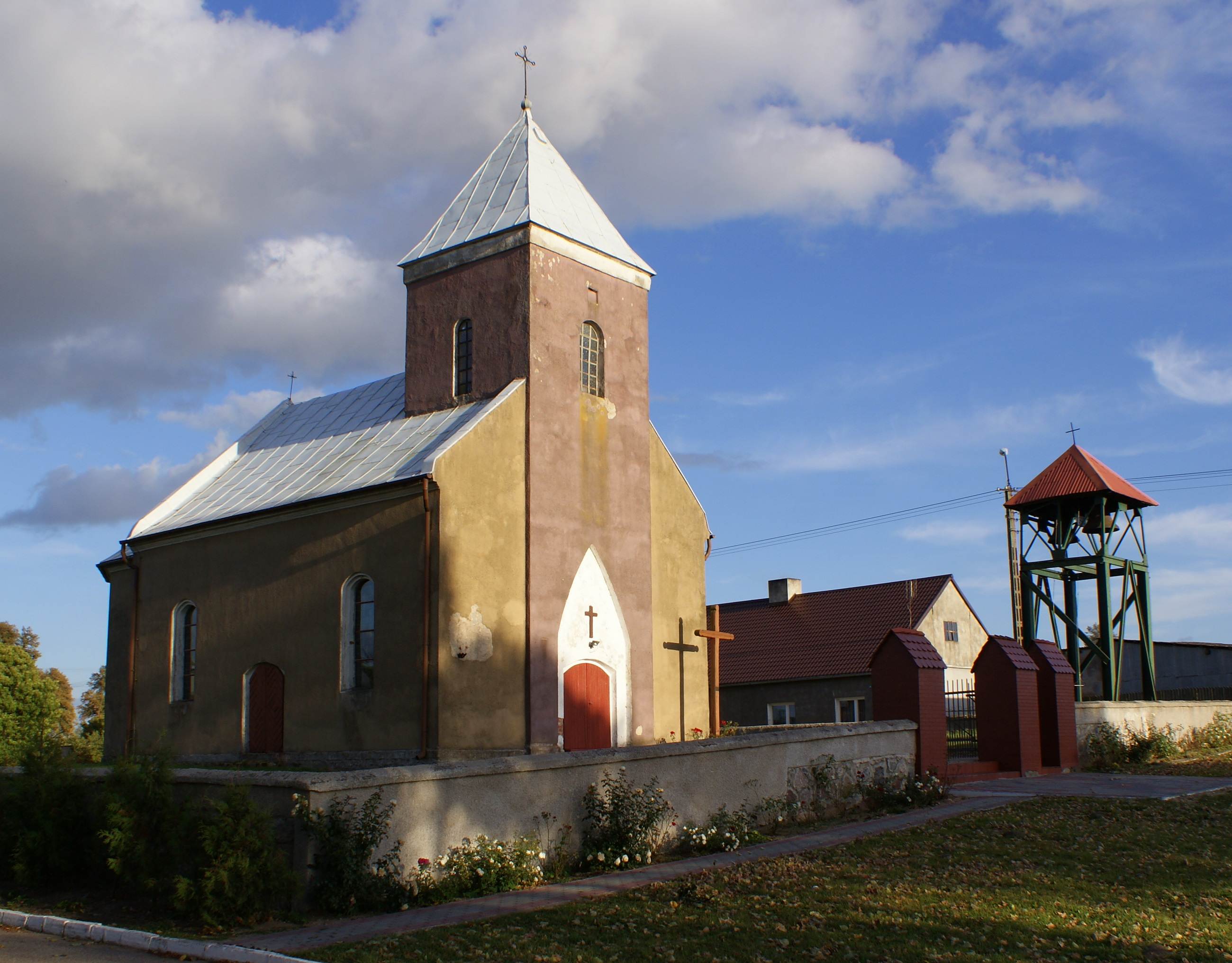
Village church, consecrated as church of the catholic congregation of Arnsfelde up to 1945

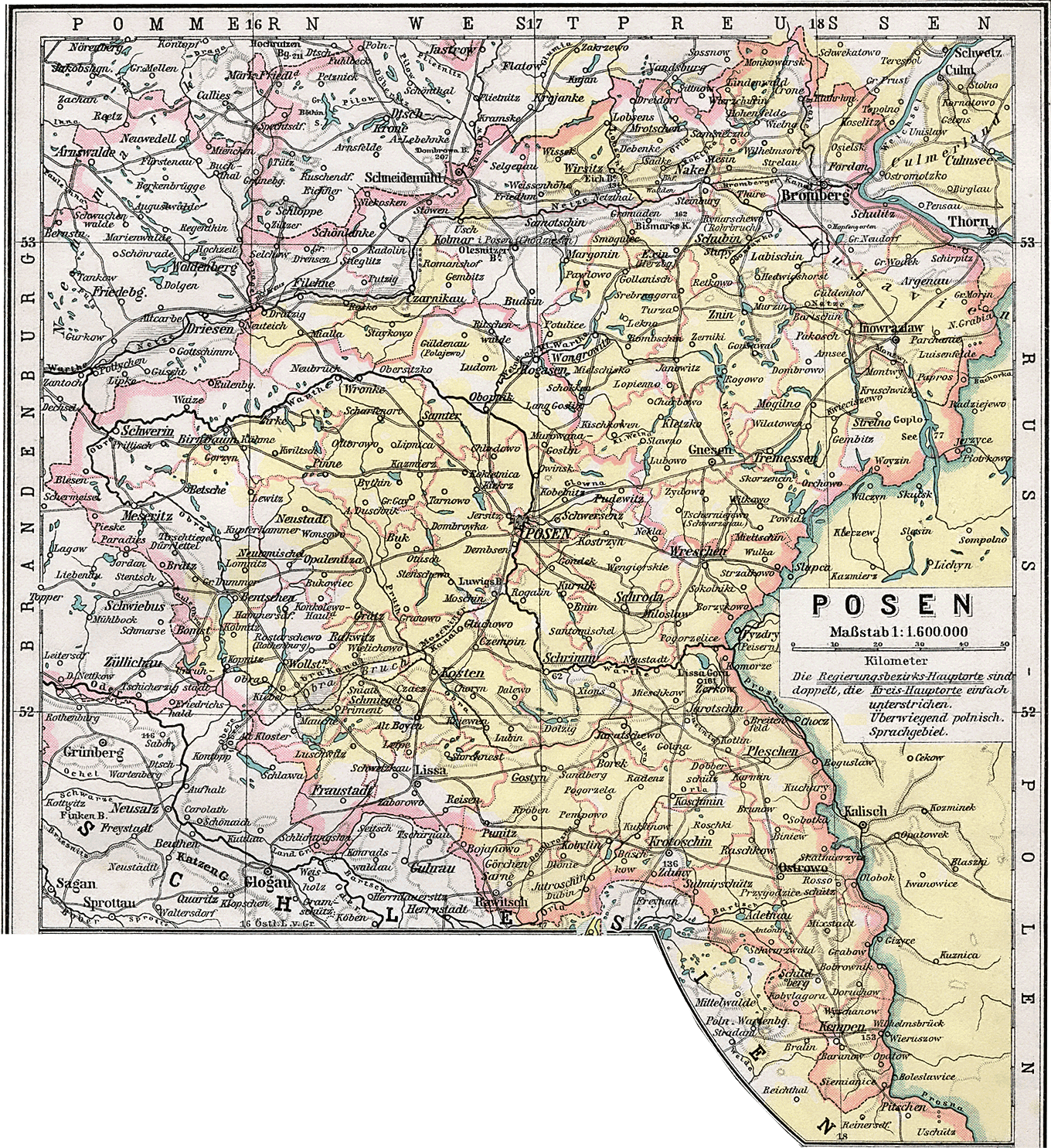
Arnsfelde (on the upper edge of the map), west-northwestern of Schneidemühl and south-southwestern of Wałcz (Deutsche Krone) on a map of the Posen province of 1905; yellow areas are regions that were dominantly Polish-speaking

Older names entail Arnsfeld (1337), Gostomia (1590), Arensfeld (1636), and modern Polish Arnopol. Arnsfelde is German, derived from the name Arnoldsfelde, potentially being founded by the knight Arnold von der Goltz, like the castles Drawsko Pomorskie, Draheim and Deutsch Krone. Gostomia refers back to the Starost Hieronymus Gostómski, who (re-)founded the settlement 1590. 1641 only catholics lived here, frequenting a wooden church.

By the eighteenth century catholic church hamlet Arnsfelde had been assigned to the Neuhof district.

1945, Arnsfelde belonged to district Deutsch Krone within Grenzmark Posen-Westpreußen off the prussion Pommern province within the German Reich.

In February 1945, Arnsfelde was occupied by the Red Army. After cessation of the battles, it was, among the rest of Hinterpommern assigned to the Republic of Poland (1944-1952) by the sowjet occupation administration. In the following years, ethnic Poles (people) moved here, and the former Arnsfelde was now administrated as Gostomia. German residents were displaced during the post-war years.
