= Świętosław, West Pomeranian Voivodeship =

Świętosław
- Village
- Location within Poland
- Coordinates: 53°21′11.16″N 16°19′58.08″E
- Country: Poland
- Voivodeship: West Pomeranian
- County: Wałcz
- Gmina: Wałcz

Świętosław (Polish: [ɕfjɛnˈtɔswaf]; German: Ludwigshorst) is a village in the administrative district of Gmina Wałcz, within Wałcz County, West Pomeranian Voivodeship, in north-western Poland.
