= Rusinowo, Gmina Wałcz =

Rusinowo
- Village
- Location within Poland
- Coordinates: 53°11′04″N 16°16′27″E
- Country: Poland
- Voivodeship: West Pomeranian
- County: Wałcz
- Gmina: Wałcz

Rusinowo [ruɕiˈnɔvɔ] (formerly German: Ruschendorf) is a village in the administrative district of Gmina Wałcz, within Wałcz County, West Pomeranian Voivodeship, in north-western Poland.
