= Kołatnik =

- Village
- Location within Poland
- Coordinates: 53°18′5″N 16°28′40″E
- Country: Poland
- Voivodeship: West Pomeranian
- County: Wałcz
- Gmina: Wałcz

Kołatnik [kɔˈwatnik] (German: Schloßmühl) is a village in the administrative district of Gmina Wałcz, within Wałcz County, West Pomeranian Voivodeship, in north-western Poland. It lies approximately 4 km (2 mi) north of Wałcz and 127 km (79 mi) east of the regional capital Szczecin.
