= Kłębowiec, West Pomeranian Voivodeship =

Kłębowiec
- Village
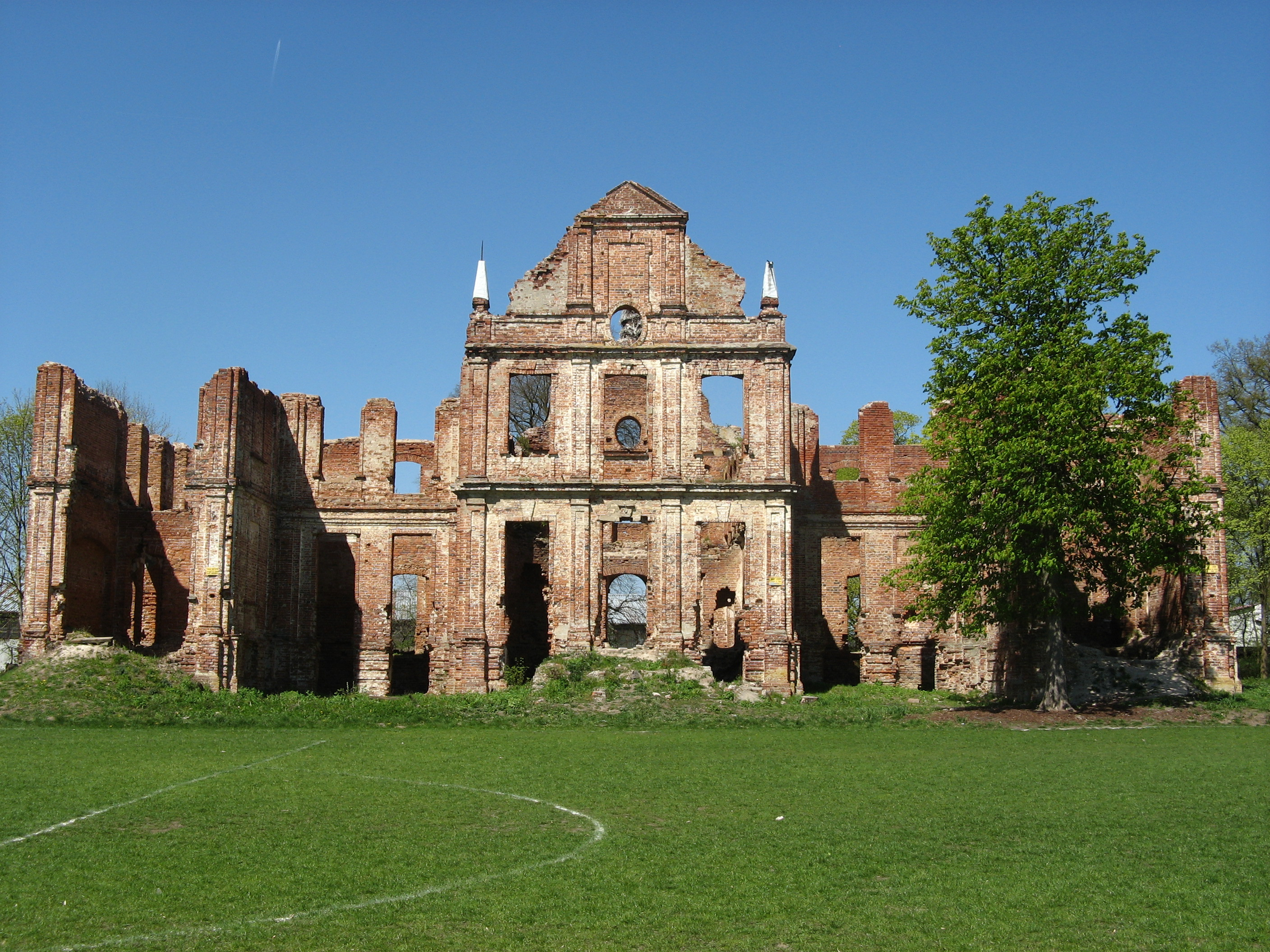
- Palace (ruins)

- Location within Poland
- Coordinates: 53°19′N 16°26′E
- Country: Poland
- Voivodeship: West Pomeranian
- County: Wałcz
- Gmina: Wałcz
- Time zone: UTC+1 (CET)
  - Summer (DST): UTC+2 (CEST)
- Vehicle registration: ZWA

Kłębowiec [kwɛmˈbɔvjɛt͡s] is a village in the administrative district of Gmina Wałcz, within Wałcz County, West Pomeranian Voivodeship, in north-western Poland. It lies approximately 6 km (4 mi) north of Wałcz and 124 km (77 mi) east of the regional capital Szczecin.
