= Boguszyn, West Pomeranian Voivodeship =

Boguszyn
- Village
- Location within Poland
- Coordinates: 53°22′7″N 16°20′17″E
- Country: Poland
- Voivodeship: West Pomeranian
- County: Wałcz
- Gmina: Wałcz
- Population: 100

Boguszyn [bɔˈɡuʂɨn] (German: Sophienau) is a village in the administrative district of Gmina Wałcz, within Wałcz County, West Pomeranian Voivodeship, in north-western Poland. It lies approximately 15 km (9 mi) north-west of Wałcz and 117 km (73 mi) east of the regional capital Szczecin.

The village has a population of 100.
