= Nagórze, West Pomeranian Voivodeship =

Nagórze
- Village
- Location within Poland
- Coordinates: 53°14′0″N 16°18′50″E
- Country: Poland
- Voivodeship: West Pomeranian
- County: Wałcz
- Gmina: Wałcz

Nagórze [naˈɡuʐɛ] (German: Ludwigsthal) is a village in the administrative district of Gmina Wałcz, within Wałcz County, West Pomeranian Voivodeship, in north-western Poland. It lies approximately 11 km (7 mi) west of Wałcz and 117 km (73 mi) east of the regional capital Szczecin.
