= Glinki, West Pomeranian Voivodeship =

Glinki
- Village
- Location within Poland
- Coordinates: 53°20′43″N 16°25′40″E
- Country: Poland
- Voivodeship: West Pomeranian
- County: Wałcz
- Gmina: Wałcz

Glinki [ˈɡlinki] is a village in the administrative district of Gmina Wałcz, within Wałcz County, West Pomeranian Voivodeship, in north-western Poland.
