= Rudnica, West Pomeranian Voivodeship =

Rudnica
- Village
- Location within Poland
- Coordinates: 53°19′54″N 16°27′28″E
- Country: Poland
- Voivodeship: West Pomeranian
- County: Wałcz
- Gmina: Wałcz

Rudnica [rudˈnit͡sa] (German: Klausdorfer Hammer) is a village in the administrative district of Gmina Wałcz, within Wałcz County, West Pomeranian Voivodeship, in north-western Poland. Main tourist attraction within Rudnica is Rudnica Park Linowy (Rudnica Ropes Course), second largest of its type in Poland.
