= Sitowo =

- Village
- Location within Poland
- Coordinates: 53°15′32″N 16°33′18″E
- Country: Poland
- Voivodeship: West Pomeranian
- County: Wałcz
- Gmina: Wałcz
- Population: 60

Sitowo [ɕiˈtɔvɔ] (German: Birkenfelde) is a village in the administrative district of Gmina Wałcz, within Wałcz County, West Pomeranian Voivodeship, in north-western Poland. It lies approximately 6 km (4 mi) east of Wałcz and 133 km (83 mi) east of the regional capital Szczecin.

The village has a population of 60.
