= Ostrowiec, Wałcz County =

Ostrowiec
- Village
- Location within Poland
- Coordinates: 53°18′3″N 16°31′47″E
- Country: Poland
- Voivodeship: West Pomeranian
- County: Wałcz
- Gmina: Wałcz
- Population: 260

Ostrowiec [ɔsˈtrɔvjɛt͡s] (German: Sagemühl) is a village in the administrative district of Gmina Wałcz, within Wałcz County, West Pomeranian Voivodeship, in north-western Poland. It lies approximately 6 km (4 mi) north-east of Wałcz and 130 km (81 mi) east of the regional capital Szczecin.

The village has a population of 260.
