= Chwiram =

- Village
- Location within Poland
- Coordinates: 53°14′N 16°28′E
- Country: Poland
- Voivodeship: West Pomeranian
- County: Wałcz
- Gmina: Wałcz
- Population: 790

Chwiram [ˈxfiram] (German: Quiram) is a village in the administrative district of Gmina Wałcz, within Wałcz County, West Pomeranian Voivodeship, in north-western Poland. It lies approximately 4 km (2 mi) south of Wałcz and 127 km (79 mi) east of the regional capital Szczecin.

The village has a population of 790.
