= Kłosowo, West Pomeranian Voivodeship =

Kłosowo
- Village
- Location within Poland
- Coordinates: 53°23′N 16°17′E
- Country: Poland
- Voivodeship: West Pomeranian
- County: Wałcz
- Gmina: Wałcz

Kłosowo [kwɔˈsɔvɔ] (German: Hansfelde) is a village in the administrative district of Gmina Wałcz, within Wałcz County, West Pomeranian Voivodeship, in north-western Poland. It lies approximately 18 km (11 mi) north-west of Wałcz and 113 km (70 mi) east of the regional capital Szczecin.
