= Papowo, West Pomeranian Voivodeship =

Papowo
- Village
- Location within Poland
- Coordinates: 53°12′37″N 16°21′33″E
- Country: Poland
- Voivodeship: West Pomeranian
- County: Wałcz
- Gmina: Wałcz

Papowo [paˈpɔvɔ] (German: Paulshof) is a village in the administrative district of Gmina Wałcz, within Wałcz County, West Pomeranian Voivodeship, in north-western Poland.
