= Bukowa Góra, West Pomeranian Voivodeship =

Bukowa Góra
- Village
- Location within Poland
- Coordinates: 53°16′55″N 16°38′4″E
- Country: Poland
- Voivodeship: West Pomeranian
- County: Wałcz
- Gmina: Wałcz

Bukowa Góra [buˈkɔva ˈɡura] (German: Buchholz) is a village in the administrative district of Gmina Wałcz, within Wałcz County, West Pomeranian Voivodeship, in north-western Poland. It lies approximately 12 km (7 mi) east of Wałcz and 138 km (86 mi) east of the regional capital Szczecin.
