= Prusinówko =

- Village
- Location within Poland
- Coordinates: 53°11′42″N 16°18′54″E
- Country: Poland
- Voivodeship: West Pomeranian
- County: Wałcz
- Gmina: Wałcz
- Population: 140

Prusinówko [pruɕiˈnufkɔ] (German: Neu Preußendorf) is a village in the administrative district of Gmina Wałcz, within Wałcz County, West Pomeranian Voivodeship, in north-western Poland. It lies approximately 13 km (8 mi) south-west of Wałcz and 118 km (73 mi) east of the regional capital Szczecin.

The village has a population of 140.
