= Jeziorko, West Pomeranian Voivodeship =

Jeziorko
- Village
- Location within Poland
- Coordinates: 53°20′35″N 16°17′35″E
- Country: Poland
- Voivodeship: West Pomeranian
- County: Wałcz
- Gmina: Wałcz
- Population: 40

Jeziorko [jɛˈʑɔrkɔ] (German: Georgsthal) is a village in the administrative district of Gmina Wałcz, within Wałcz County, West Pomeranian Voivodeship, in north-western Poland. It lies approximately 15 km (9 mi) north-west of Wałcz and 114 km (71 mi) east of the regional capital Szczecin.

The village has a population of 40.
