= Brzezinki, West Pomeranian Voivodeship =

Brzezinki
- Village
- Location within Poland
- Coordinates: 53°12′50″N 16°24′33″E
- Country: Poland
- Voivodeship: West Pomeranian
- County: Wałcz
- Gmina: Wałcz
- Population: 110

Brzezinki [bʐɛˈʑinki] is a village in the administrative district of Gmina Wałcz, within Wałcz County, West Pomeranian Voivodeship, in north-western Poland. It lies approximately 7 km (4 mi) south-west of Wałcz and 124 km (77 mi) east of the regional capital Szczecin.

The village has a population of 110.
