= Iłowiec, West Pomeranian Voivodeship =

Iłowiec
- Village
- Location within Poland
- Coordinates: 53°25′21″N 16°23′16″E
- Country: Poland
- Voivodeship: West Pomeranian
- County: Wałcz
- Gmina: Wałcz

Iłowiec [iˈwɔvjɛt͡s] (German: Haugsdorf) is a village in the administrative district of Gmina Wałcz, within Wałcz County, West Pomeranian Voivodeship, in north-western Poland.
