= Popowo, Wałcz County =

Popowo
- Village
- Location within Poland
- Coordinates: 53°10′28″N 16°28′38″E
- Country: Poland
- Voivodeship: West Pomeranian
- County: Wałcz
- Gmina: Wałcz
- Population: 130

Popowo [pɔˈpɔvɔ] (German: Paulsruh) is a village in the administrative district of Gmina Wałcz, Wałcz County, West Pomeranian Voivodeship, Poland. It lies approximately 11 km (7 mi) south of Wałcz and 129 km (80 mi) east of the regional capital Szczecin.

The village has a population of 130.
