= Lubno, West Pomeranian Voivodeship =

Lubno
- Village
- Location within Poland
- Coordinates: 53°20′N 16°21′E
- Country: Poland
- Voivodeship: West Pomeranian
- County: Wałcz
- Gmina: Wałcz

Lubno [ˈlubnɔ] (German: Lüben) is a village in the administrative district of Gmina Wałcz, within Wałcz County, West Pomeranian Voivodeship, in north-western Poland. It lies approximately 11 km (7 mi) north-west of Wałcz and 118 km (73 mi) east of the regional capital Szczecin.
