= Rutwica =

- Village
- Location within Poland
- Coordinates: 53°13′42″N 16°16′40″E
- Country: Poland
- Voivodeship: West Pomeranian
- County: Wałcz
- Gmina: Wałcz

Rutwica [rutˈfit͡sa] (German: Harmelsdorf) is a village in the administrative district of Gmina Wałcz, within Wałcz County, West Pomeranian Voivodeship, in north-western Poland. It lies approximately 13 km (8 mi) west of Wałcz and 115 km (71 mi) east of the regional capital Szczecin.
