= Jarogniewie =

- Village
- Location within Poland
- Coordinates: 53°22′39″N 16°22′23″E
- Country: Poland
- Voivodeship: West Pomeranian
- County: Wałcz
- Gmina: Wałcz

Jarogniewie [jarɔɡˈɲɛvjɛ] (German: Johannisthal) is a village in the administrative district of Gmina Wałcz, within Wałcz County, West Pomeranian Voivodeship, in north-western Poland.
