= Prusinowo Wałeckie =

- Village
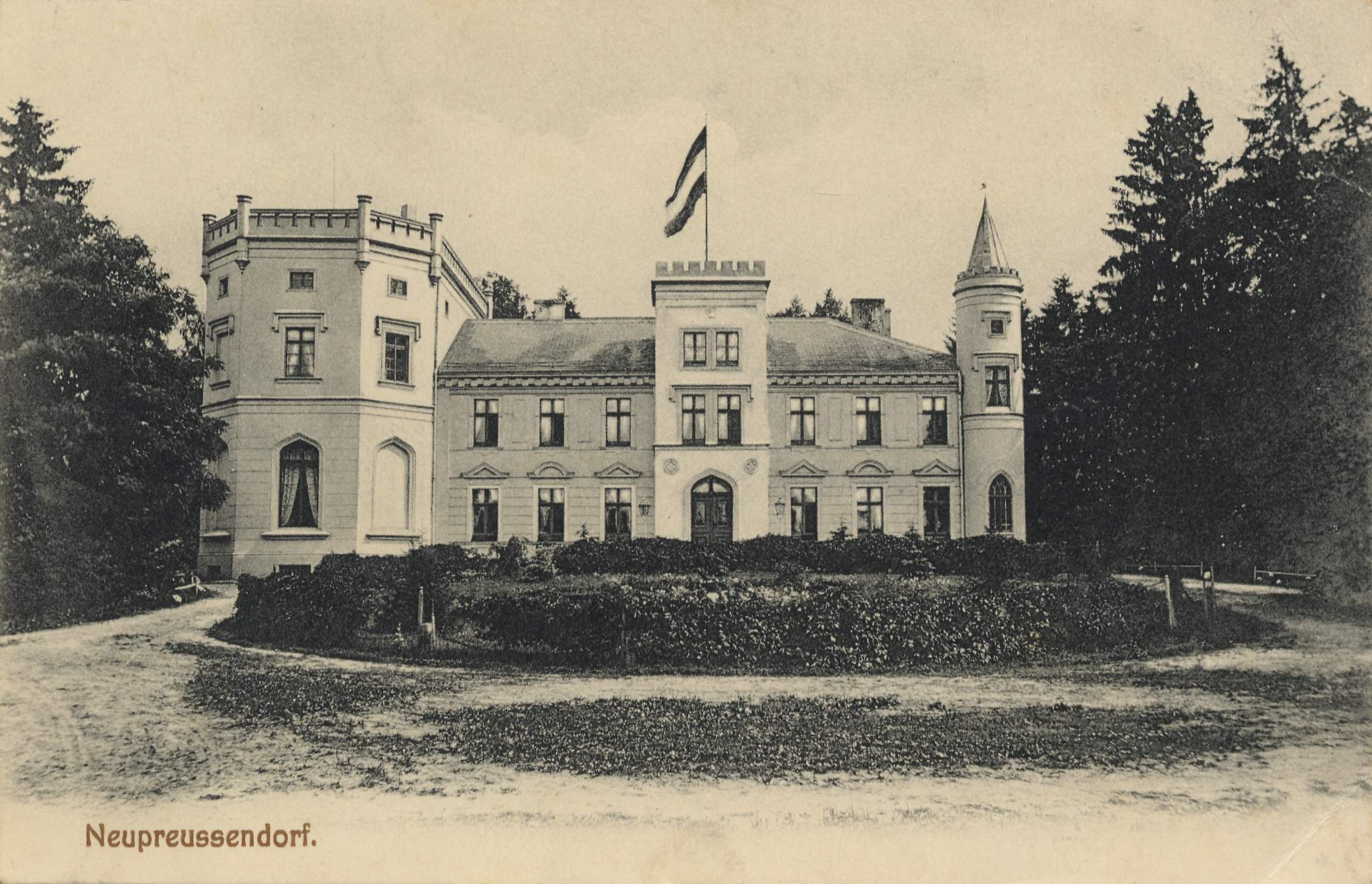
- Palace in Neupreussendorf

- Location within Poland
- Coordinates: 53°12′34″N 16°18′36″E
- Country: Poland
- Voivodeship: West Pomeranian
- County: Wałcz
- Gmina: Wałcz

Prusinowo Wałeckie (Polish: [pruɕiˈnɔvɔ vaˈwɛt͡skʲɛ]; German: Preußendorf) is a village in the administrative district of Gmina Wałcz, within Wałcz County, West Pomeranian Voivodeship, in north-western Poland.
