= Różewo, West Pomeranian Voivodeship =

Różewo
- Village
- Location within Poland
- Coordinates: 53°12′N 16°30′E
- Country: Poland
- Voivodeship: West Pomeranian
- County: Wałcz
- Gmina: Wałcz
- Population: 950

Różewo [ruˈʐɛvɔ] (German: Rosenfelde) is a village in the administrative district of Gmina Wałcz, within Wałcz County, West Pomeranian Voivodeship, in north-western Poland. It lies approximately 8 km (5 mi) south of Wałcz and 130 km (81 mi) east of the regional capital Szczecin.

The village has a population of 950.
