= Dobrogoszcz, Wałcz County =

Dobrogoszcz
- Village
- Location within Poland
- Coordinates: 53°22′15″N 16°22′44″E
- Country: Poland
- Voivodeship: West Pomeranian
- County: Wałcz
- Gmina: Wałcz

Dobrogoszcz [dɔˈbrɔɡɔʂt͡ʂ] (German: Augustenburg) is a village in the administrative district of Gmina Wałcz, within Wałcz County, West Pomeranian Voivodeship, in north-western Poland.
