= Laski Wałeckie =

- Village
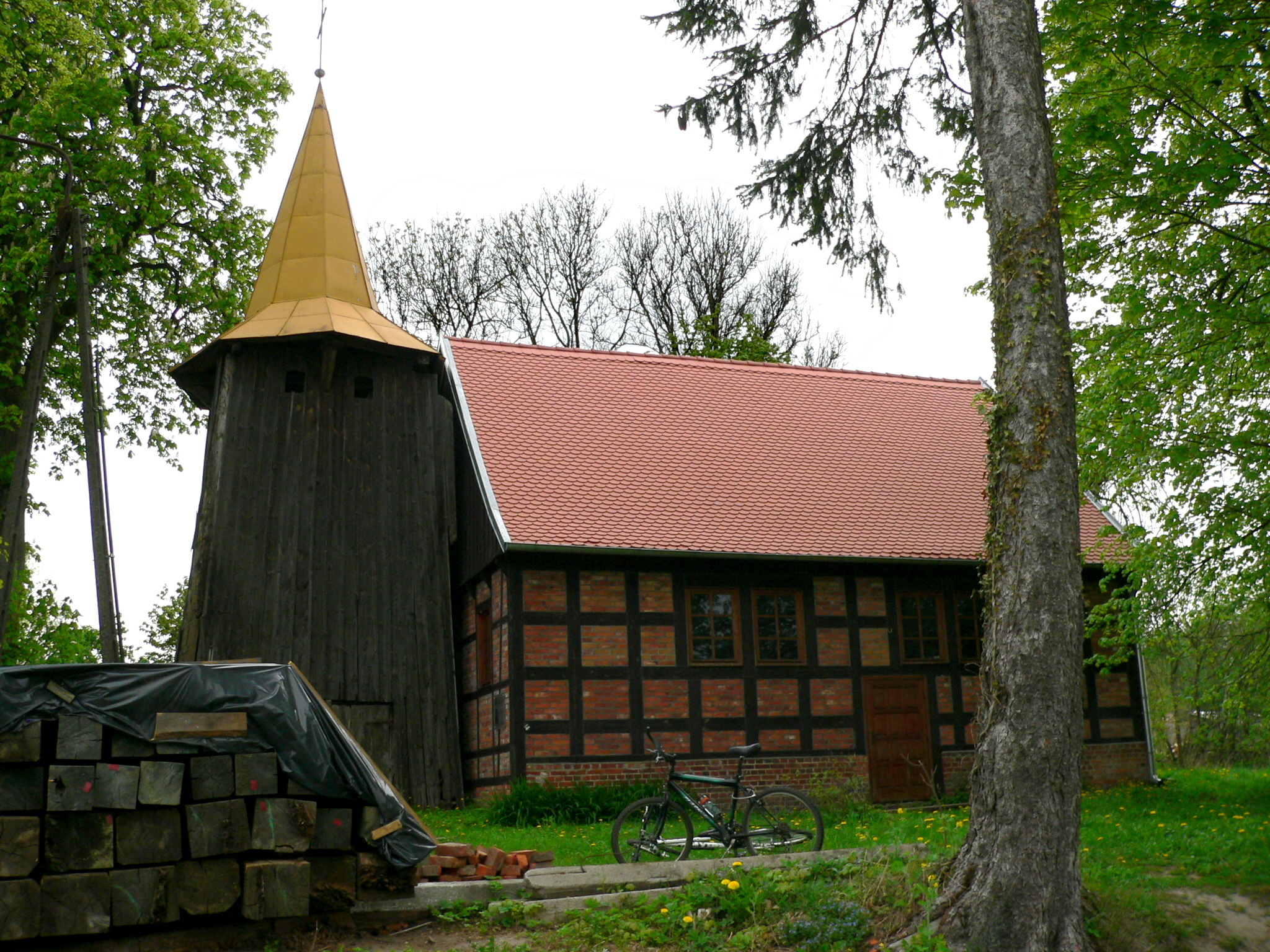
- Church in Laski Wałeckie

- Location within Poland
- Coordinates: 53°21′53″N 16°15′46″E
- Country: Poland
- Voivodeship: West Pomeranian
- County: Wałcz
- Gmina: Wałcz

Laski Wałeckie (Polish pronunciation: [ˈlaskʲi vaˈwɛtskʲɛ]; German: Latzig) is a village in the administrative district of Gmina Wałcz, within Wałcz County, West Pomeranian Voivodeship, in north-western Poland.
