= Lipie, Wałcz County =

Lipie
- Village
- Location within Poland
- Coordinates: 53°23′9″N 16°14′1″E
- Country: Poland
- Voivodeship: West Pomeranian
- County: Wałcz
- Gmina: Wałcz
- Population: 20

Lipie [ˈlipjɛ] (German: Althof) is a village in the administrative district of Gmina Wałcz, within Wałcz County, West Pomeranian Voivodeship, in north-western Poland. It lies approximately 21 km (13 mi) north-west of Wałcz and 110 km (68 mi) east of the regional capital Szczecin.

The village has a population of 40.
