= Czechyń =

- Village
- Location within Poland
- Coordinates: 53°18′12″N 16°39′0″E
- Country: Poland
- Voivodeship: West Pomeranian
- County: Wałcz
- Gmina: Wałcz
- Population: 100

Czechyń [ˈt͡ʂɛxɨɲ] (German: Zechendorf) is a village in the administrative district of Gmina Wałcz, within Wałcz County, West Pomeranian Voivodeship, in north-western Poland. It lies approximately 13 km (8 mi) east of Wałcz and 138 km (86 mi) east of the regional capital Szczecin.

The village has a population of 100.
