= Czepiec, West Pomeranian Voivodeship =

Czepiec
- Village
- Location within Poland
- Coordinates: 53°22′39″N 16°18′15″E
- Country: Poland
- Voivodeship: West Pomeranian
- County: Wałcz
- Gmina: Wałcz
- Population: 60

Czepiec ([ˈt͡ʂɛpjɛt͡s], German: Marquardsthal) is a village in the administrative district of Gmina Wałcz, within Wałcz County, West Pomeranian Voivodeship, in north-western Poland. It lies approximately 17 km (11 mi) north-west of Wałcz and 115 km (71 mi) east of the regional capital Szczecin.

The village has a population of 60.
