= Smoląg, West Pomeranian Voivodeship =

Smoląg
- Village
- Location within Poland
- Coordinates: 53°09′38″N 16°23′22″E
- Country: Poland
- Voivodeship: West Pomeranian
- County: Wałcz
- Gmina: Wałcz

Smoląg [ˈsmɔlɔŋk] (German: Teerofen) is a village in the administrative district of Gmina Wałcz, within Wałcz County, West Pomeranian Voivodeship, in north-western Poland.
