= Dobino, Wałcz County =

Dobino
- Village
- Location within Poland
- Coordinates: 53°14′N 16°32′E
- Country: Poland
- Voivodeship: West Pomeranian
- County: Wałcz
- Gmina: Wałcz

Dobino [dɔˈbinɔ] (German: Breitenstein) is a village in the administrative district of Gmina Wałcz, within Wałcz County, West Pomeranian Voivodeship, in north-western Poland. It lies approximately 6 km (4 mi) south-east of Wałcz and 132 km (82 mi) east of the regional capital Szczecin.
