= Głowaczewo, Wałcz County =

Głowaczewo
- Village
- Location within Poland
- Coordinates: 53°19′0″N 16°36′40″E
- Country: Poland
- Voivodeship: West Pomeranian
- County: Wałcz
- Gmina: Wałcz

Głowaczewo [ɡwɔvaˈt͡ʂɛvɔ] (German: Klawittersdorf) is a village in the administrative district of Gmina Wałcz, within Wałcz County, West Pomeranian Voivodeship, in north-western Poland. It lies approximately 12 km (7 mi) north-east of Wałcz and 136 km (85 mi) east of the regional capital Szczecin.
