= Kolno, Wałcz County =

Kolno
- Village
- Location within Poland
- Coordinates: 53°21′N 16°21′E
- Country: Poland
- Voivodeship: West Pomeranian
- County: Wałcz
- Gmina: Wałcz
- Population (approx.): 120

Kolno [ˈkɔlnɔ] (German: Eckartsberge) is a village in the administrative district of Gmina Wałcz, within Wałcz County, West Pomeranian Voivodeship, in north-western Poland. It lies approximately 13 km (8 mi) north-west of Wałcz and 118 km (73 mi) east of the regional capital Szczecin.

The village has an approximate population of 120.
