= Dobrzyca Leśna =

- Village
- Location within Poland
- Coordinates: 53°16′25″N 16°38′41″E
- Country: Poland
- Voivodeship: West Pomeranian
- County: Wałcz
- Gmina: Wałcz

Dobrzyca Leśna [dɔˈbʐɨt͡sa ˈlɛɕna] (German: Borkendorf) is a village in the administrative district of Gmina Wałcz, within Wałcz County, West Pomeranian Voivodeship, in North-Western Poland.
