= Omulno =

- Village
- Location within Poland
- Coordinates: 53°19′8″N 16°23′10″E
- Country: Poland
- Voivodeship: West Pomeranian
- County: Wałcz
- Gmina: Wałcz
- Population: 100

Omulno [ɔˈmulnɔ] (German: Vorwerk Lassere) is a village in the administrative district of Gmina Wałcz, within Wałcz County, West Pomeranian Voivodeship, in north-western Poland. It lies approximately 8 km (5 mi) north-west of Wałcz and 121 km (75 mi) east of the regional capital Szczecin.

The village has a population of 100.
