= Nowa Szwecja =

- Village
- Location within Poland
- Coordinates: 53°19′27″N 16°33′31″E
- Country: Poland
- Voivodeship: West Pomeranian
- County: Wałcz
- Gmina: Wałcz

Nowa Szwecja (Polish: [ˈnɔva ˈʂfɛt͡sja]; German: Gut Neufriedenfier) is a village in the administrative district of Gmina Wałcz, within Wałcz County, West Pomeranian Voivodeship, in north-western Poland. It lies approximately 9 km (6 mi) north-east of Wałcz and 132 km (82 mi) east of the regional capital Szczecin.
