= Pluskota =

- Village
- Location within Poland
- Coordinates: 53°18′23″N 16°28′4″E
- Country: Poland
- Voivodeship: West Pomeranian
- County: Wałcz
- Gmina: Wałcz
- Population: 18

Pluskota [plusˈkɔta] (German: Stadtmühl) is a village in the administrative district of Gmina Wałcz, within Wałcz County, West Pomeranian Voivodeship, in north-western Poland. It lies approximately 5 km (3 mi) north of Wałcz and 126 km (78 mi) east of the regional capital Szczecin.

The village has a population of 18.
