= Górnica, West Pomeranian Voivodeship =

Górnica
- Village
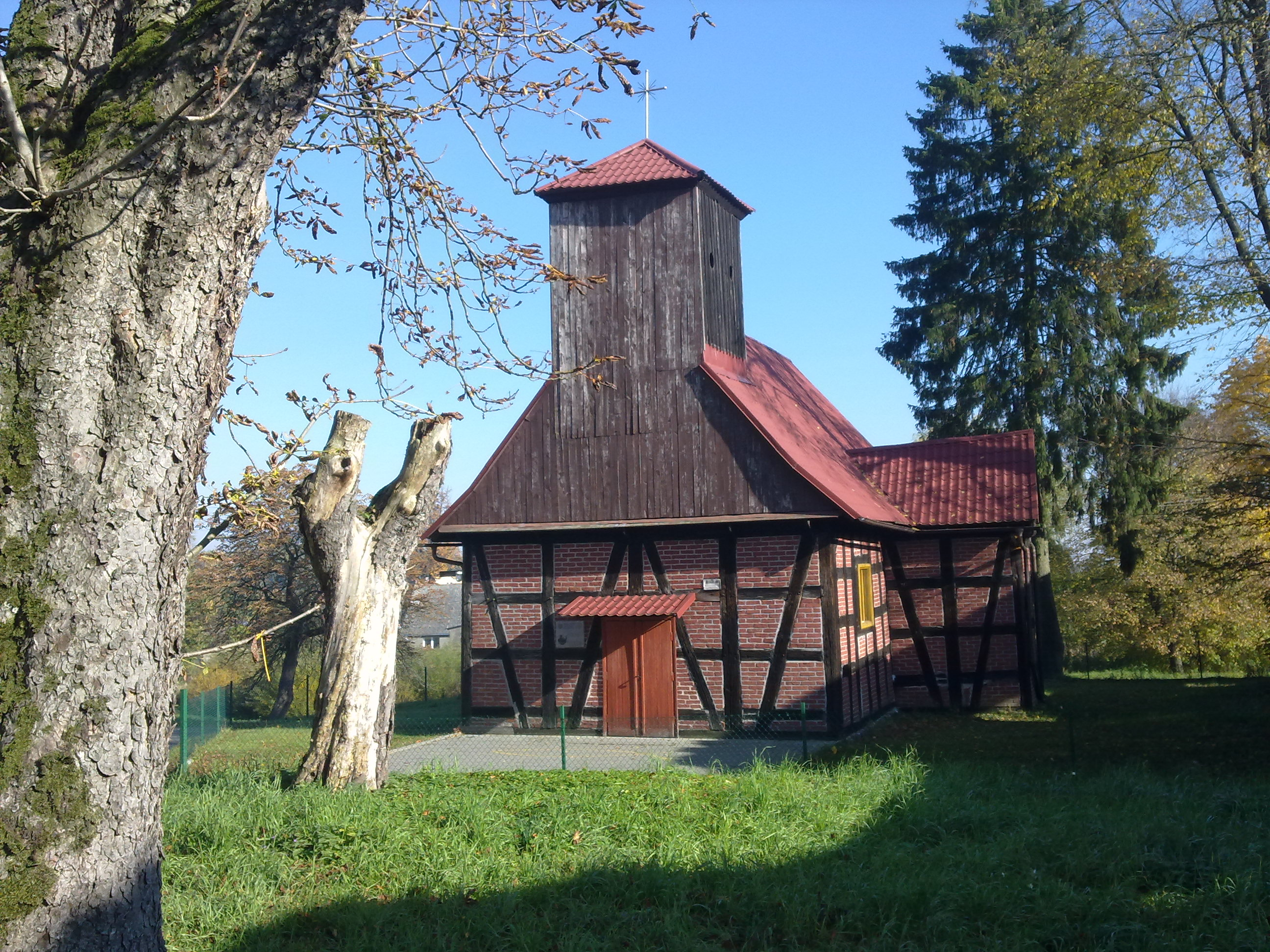
- Church in Górnica

- Location within Poland
- Coordinates: 53°22′N 16°17′E
- Country: Poland
- Voivodeship: West Pomeranian
- County: Wałcz
- Gmina: Wałcz

Górnica [ɡurˈnit͡sa] (German: Hohenstein) is a village in the administrative district of Gmina Wałcz, within Wałcz County, West Pomeranian Voivodeship, in north-western Poland. It lies approximately 17 km (11 mi) north-west of Wałcz and 113 km (70 mi) east of the regional capital Szczecin.
