= Ługi Wałeckie =

- Village
- Location within Poland
- Coordinates: 53°12′52″N 16°23′32″E
- Country: Poland
- Voivodeship: West Pomeranian
- County: Wałcz
- Gmina: Wałcz

Ługi Wałeckie (Polish: [ˈwuɡʲi vaˈwɛt͡skʲɛ]; German: Karlsruhe) is a village in the administrative district of Gmina Wałcz, within Wałcz County, West Pomeranian Voivodeship, in north-western Poland.
