= Dzikowo, Wałcz County =

Dzikowo
- Village
- Location within Poland
- Coordinates: 53°11′14″N 16°22′41″E
- Country: Poland
- Voivodeship: West Pomeranian
- County: Wałcz
- Gmina: Wałcz

Dzikowo [d͡ʑiˈkɔvɔ] (German: Dyck) is a village in the administrative district of Gmina Wałcz, within Wałcz County, West Pomeranian Voivodeship, in north-western Poland. It lies approximately 11 km (7 mi) south-west of Wałcz and 123 km (76 mi) east of the regional capital Szczecin.
