= Dębołęka, West Pomeranian Voivodeship =

Dębołęka
- Village
- Location within Poland
- Coordinates: 53°22′N 16°20′E
- Country: Poland
- Voivodeship: West Pomeranian
- County: Wałcz
- Gmina: Wałcz
- Population: 380

Dębołęka [dɛmbɔˈwɛnka] (German: Dammlang) is the village in the administrative district of Gmina Wałcz within Wałcz County West Pomeranian Voivodeship in north-western Poland, It lies approximately 15 km (9 mi) north-west of Wałcz and 117 km (73 mi) east of the regional capital Szczecin, it is mainly surrounded by farm land, the village has a population of 380.
