= Przybkowo, Wałcz County =

Przybkowo
- Village
- Location within Poland
- Coordinates: 53°13′40″N 16°29′53″E
- Country: Poland
- Voivodeship: West Pomeranian
- County: Wałcz
- Gmina: Wałcz

Przybkowo [pʂɨpˈkɔvɔ] (German: Philippshof) is a village in the administrative district of Gmina Wałcz, within Wałcz County, West Pomeranian Voivodeship, in north-western Poland.
