= Wałcz Drugi =

- Village
- Location within Poland
- Coordinates: 53°15′25″N 16°31′15″E
- Country: Poland
- Voivodeship: West Pomeranian
- County: Wałcz
- Gmina: Wałcz
- Population: 150

Wałcz Drugi [ˈvau̯t͡ʂ ˈdruɡi] is a village in the administrative district of Gmina Wałcz, within Wałcz County, West Pomeranian Voivodeship, in north-western Poland. It lies approximately 4 km (2 mi) east of Wałcz and 130 km (81 mi) east of the regional capital Szczecin.
