= Nakielno =

- Village
- Location within Poland
- Coordinates: 53°15′42″N 16°18′15″E
- Country: Poland
- Voivodeship: West Pomeranian
- County: Wałcz
- Gmina: Wałcz

Nakielno [naˈkʲɛlnɔ] (German: Klein Nakel) is a village in the administrative district of Gmina Wałcz, within Wałcz County, West Pomeranian Voivodeship, in north-western Poland. It lies approximately 11 km (7 mi) west of Wałcz and 116 km (72 mi) east of the regional capital Szczecin.

This was formerly the town of Klein Nakel, in the German province of West Prussia. The population was expelled by the Poles and Russians.
