= Deutsch Krone (district) =

District in Prussia from 1772 to 1945

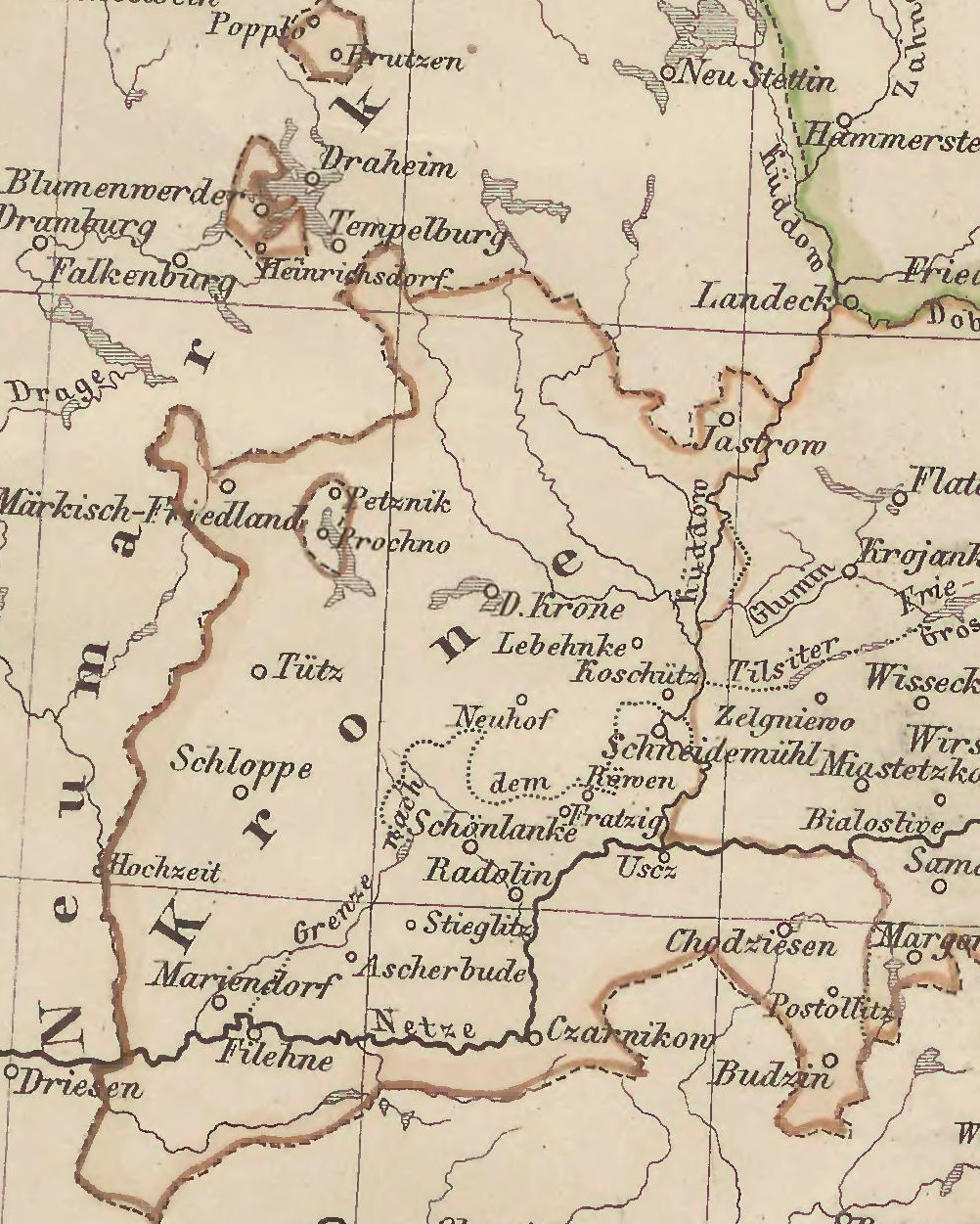
Deutsch Krone district (1772-1807)

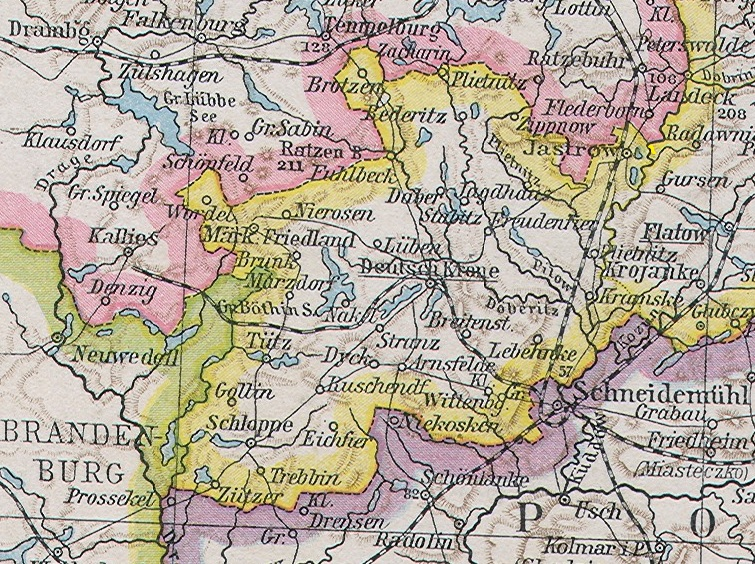
Deutsch Krone district (1818-1945)

Province of West Prussia (1913) Regierungsbezirk Danzig Regierungsbezirk Marienwerder

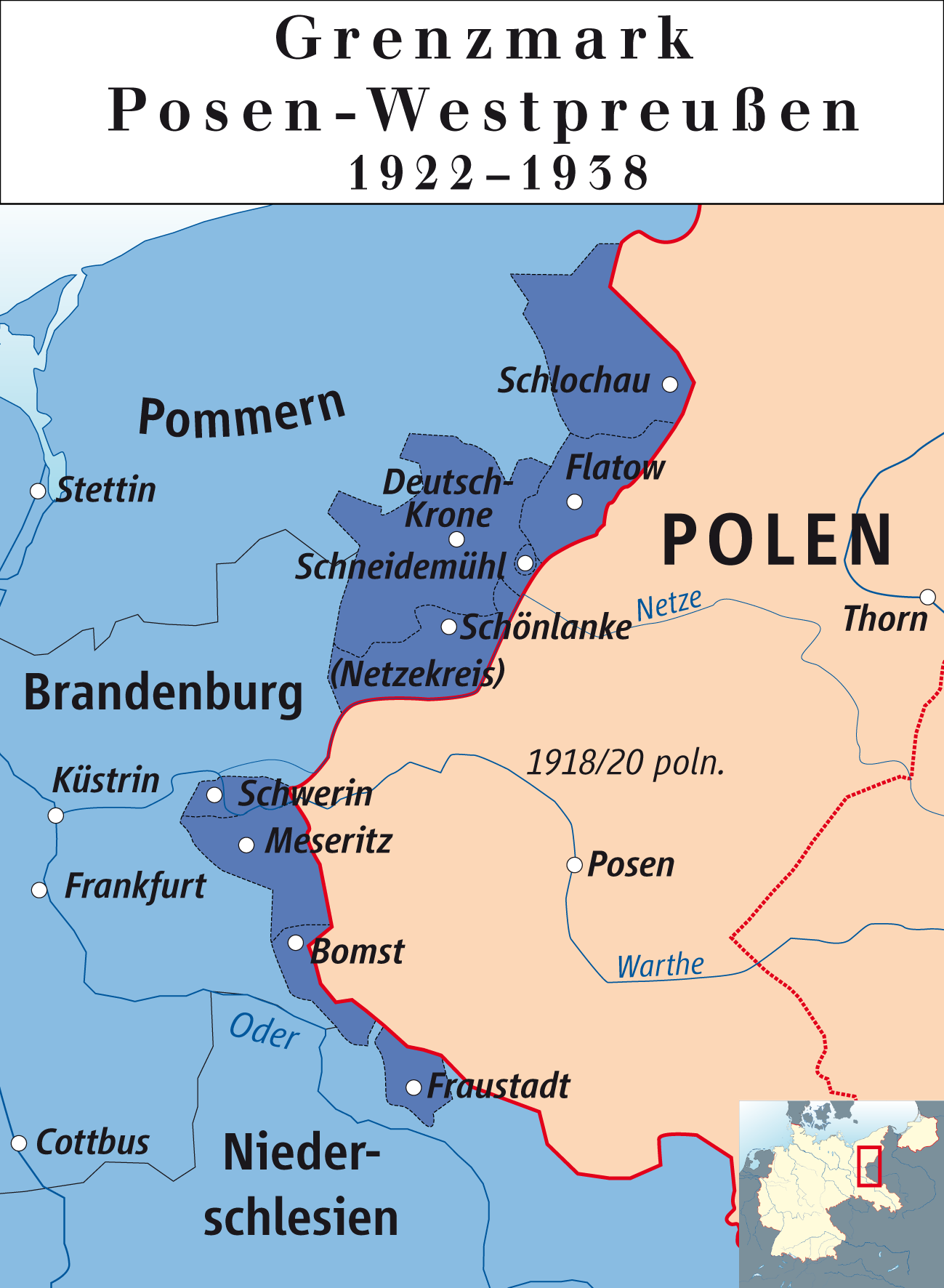
Province of Posen-West Prussia with district boundaries (1938)

The district of Deutsch Krone (German: Landkreis Deutsch Krone) was a district in Prussia from 1772 to 1945. It belonged to the part of West Prussia that remained in the German Reich after World War I and became part of the Province of Grenzmark Posen-West Prussia. From 1938 to 1945, it belonged to the Province of Pomerania. Today the territory of the district area lies in the Polish Voivodeships of West Pomerania and Greater Poland.

== History ==
The Deutsch Krone district became part of the Kingdom of Prussia after the First Partition of Poland in 1772. Through the Treaty of Tilsit, the southern part of the district with the towns of Filehne, Schönlanke and Schneidemühl fell to the Duchy of Warsaw in 1807. As part of the Prussian administrative reforms, on 30 April 1815 the district became part of the new administrative region of Marienwerder in the province of West Prussia. Several exclaves were mutually exchanged with the neighboring district of Dramburg in the northwest. After the final determination of the new district boundaries in the Marienwerder region, the Deutsch Krone district comprised the towns of Deutsch Krone, Jastrow, Märkisch Friedland, Schloppe and Tütz. The seat of the district office was in the town of Deutsch Krone.

Province of Pomerania (1939) with the administrative region of Grenzmark Posen-West Prussia in Green

From 3 December 1829 to 1 April 1878, West Prussia and East Prussia were united to form the Province of Prussia, which had belonged to the German Reich since January 1871. In contrast to most of the other West Prussian districts, the predominantly German-populated district of Deutsch Krone remained in Germany after World War I. On 20 November 1919 the district was subordinated to the new administrative region of Grenzmark West Prussia-Posen with its seat in Schneidemühl. On 11 January 1921 the administrative region of "Grenzmark West Prussia-Posen" was renamed "Grenzmark Posen-West Prussia". On 1 July 1922 the new province of Grenzmark Posen-West Prussia was formed from the administrative region. The new administrative region of Schneidemühl was formed on 1 August 1922, which was congruent to the province. On 1 October 1938, after the dissolution of the Province of Grenzmark Posen-West Prussia, the Deutsch Krone district was incorporated into the Province of Pomerania. For reasons of tradition, the administrative region of Schneidemühl was given the name "Grenzmark Posen-West Prussia".

In the spring of 1945, the area of the Deutsch Krone district was occupied by the Red Army. After the end of World War II, the district fell within the newly redrawn borders of Poland under the terms of the Potsdam Agreement.

== Demographics ==
The district had a mostly German population with a small Polish minority.

Ethnolinguistic structure of the Deutsch Krone district
Year	Population	German		Polish / Bilingual / Other	
1905	63,706	62,977	98.9%	729	1.1%
1910	62,182	61,143	98.3%	1,039	1.7%

== Elections ==
In the German Empire, the Deutsch Krone district formed the Marienwerder 8 Reichstag constituency. The constituency was won by national liberal or conservative candidates in all Reichstag elections:

- 1871: Franz Adolph Guenther, Free Conservative Party
- 1874: Friedrich Lehr, National Liberal Party
- 1877: Friedrich Lehr, National Liberal Party
- 1878: Theodor zu Stolberg-Wernigerode, German Conservative Party
- 1881: Max von Brauchitsch, German Conservative Party
- 1884: Karl von Gamp-Massaunen, Free Conservative Party
- 1887: Karl von Gamp-Massaunen, Free Conservative Party
- 1890: Karl von Gamp-Massaunen, Free Conservative Party
- 1893: Karl von Gamp-Massaunen, Free Conservative Party
- 1898: Karl von Gamp-Massaunen, Free Conservative Party
- 1903: Karl von Gamp-Massaunen, Free Conservative Party
- 1907: Karl von Gamp-Massaunen, Free Conservative Party
- 1912: Karl von Gamp-Massaunen, Free Conservative Party

== Municipalities ==
At the end of its existence in 1945, the district contained 5 towns and 92 other municipalities.

- Alt Lobitz
- Appelwerder
- Arnsfelde
- Betkenhammer
- Bevilsthal
- Birkholz
- Borkendorf
- Breitenstein
- Briesenitz
- Brotzen
- Brunk
- Buchholz
- Dammlang
- Deutsch Krone, town
- Doderlage
- Dolfusbruch
- Drahnow
- Dyck
- Eckartsberge
- Eichfier
- Flathe
- Freudenfier
- Gollin
- Gramattenbrück
- Groß Wittenberg
- Groß Zacharin
- Hansfelde
- Harmelsdorf
- Hasenberg
- Haugsdorf
- Henkendorf
- Hoffstädt
- Hohenstein
- Jagdhaus
- Jagolitz
- Jastrow, town
- Kappe
- Karlsruhe
- Kattun
- Kegelsmühl
- Keßburg
- Klausdorf
- Klawittersdorf
- Klein Nakel
- Klein Wittenberg
- Knakendorf
- Koschütz
- Kramske
- Krummfließ
- Königsgnade
- Latzig
- Lebehnke
- Lubsdorf
- Lüben
- Machlin
- Märkisch Friedland, town
- Marthe
- Marzdorf
- Mehlgast
- Mellentin
- Neu Lebehnke
- Neu Zippnow
- Neugolz
- Neuhof
- Petznick
- Plietnitz
- Plötzmin
- Prellwitz
- Preußendorf
- Prochnow
- Quiram
- Rederitz
- Riege
- Rose
- Rosenfelde
- Ruschendorf
- Sagemühl
- Salm
- Schloppe, town
- Schrotz
- Schulzendorf
- Schönow
- Seegenfelde
- Springberg
- Stabitz
- Stibbe
- Strahlenberg
- Stranz
- Trebbin
- Tütz, town
- Wissulke
- Wittkow
- Wordel
- Zadow
- Zechendorf
- Zippnow
- Zützer

== Transportation ==
The first rail connection in the district was established in 1879 on the Schneidemühl - Jastrow - Neustettin line of the Prussian Eastern Railway. Then in 1881, the Prussian State Railroad reached the district town Deutsch Krone from Schneidemühl and then in 1888, the junction of Kallies in the district of Dramburg.

After the town of Märkisch Friedland in the west of the district was connected to the Kallies - Falkenburg route in 1900, the Tempelburg - Jastrow line followed in the north in 1908, which was extended to Flatow in 1914. At the same time, the Deutsch Krone - Plietnitz - Flatow line also went into operation.

Before that, the Deutsch Krone district had built two small railways of its own, starting from the district town:

- 1898 from Westbahnhof to Virchow in the Dramburg district and
- 1904 from the Südbahnhof to Schloppe, where as early as 1899 the line continued to Kreuz. This created a rail network of length 220 km, 63 km of which belonged to the district.

The former Reichsstrasse 1 (Aachen - Eydtkuhnen) ran through Deutsch Krone.
