= Piława, Wałcz County =

Village in Gmina Wałcz, Poland

Piława
- Village
- Location within Poland
- Coordinates: 53°18′24″N 16°23′52″E
- Country: Poland
- Voivodeship: West Pomeranian
- County: Wałcz
- Gmina: Wałcz

Piława [piˈwava] (German: Pilowbrück) is a village in the administrative district of Gmina Wałcz, within Wałcz County, West Pomeranian Voivodeship, in north-western Poland.
