= Sosnówka, West Pomeranian Voivodeship =

Neighbourhood of Wałcz, Poland

Sosnówka
- Village
- Location within Poland
- Coordinates: 53°16′11″N 16°25′56″E
- Country: Poland
- Voivodeship: West Pomeranian
- County: Wałcz
- Gmina: Wałcz (town)

Sosnówka [sɔsˈnufka] is a part of the town Wałcz, within Wałcz County, West Pomeranian Voivodeship, in north-western Poland.
