= Herbert Schröder-Stranz =

- Born: 9 June 1884; Stranz, West Prussia, German Empire
- Disappeared: 15 August 1912 (aged 28); Nordaustlandet, Norway
- Occupation: Explorer
- Known for: expedition to the Northeast Passage

Herbert Schröder-Stranz (9 June 1884 – 15 August 1912) was a German officer and explorer of polar regions. He led the German Arctic Expedition of 1912.

== Biography ==
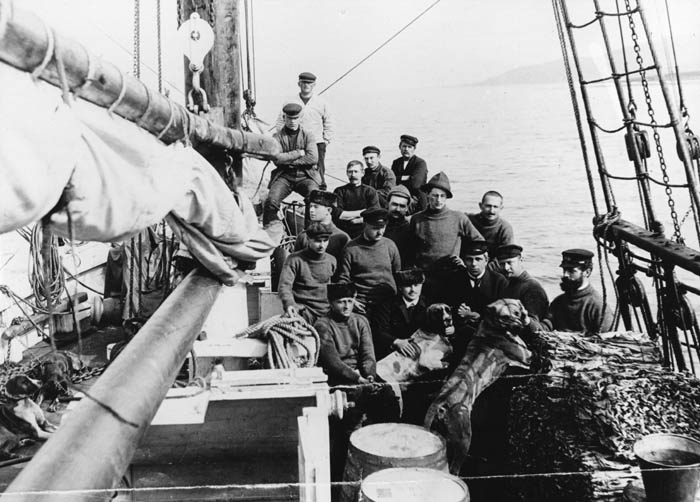
The crew of the German Arctic Expedition, Schröder-Stranz in the centre

Schröder-Stranz was born at his family estate at Stranz, West Prussia (modern Strączno, Poland), and later added the name of his birthplace to his family's name (Schröder is a common name in Germany). His original name was Herbert Schröder, but later he added Stranz to it to reflect his village's name.

Schröder-Stranz joined the German Army and was deployed in German South-West Africa, he later travelled the Russian Kola Peninsula, where he began to plan an expedition to discover the Northeast Passage.

In 1912 a preliminary expedition started aboard of the schooner Herzog Ernst, a ship under the command of Alfred Ritscher and named after Ernst II, Duke of Saxe-Altenburg, the main sponsor of the project.

The crew, among them the illustrator Christopher Rave, assembled on 1 August 1912 in Tromsø. As the public fund-raising had been less successful than expected, Schröder-Stranz searched for a way to improve the publicity. He changed the initial plans and proposed to cross Spitsbergen's Nordaustlandet from the South to the North, the first expedition to do so.

The expedition left Tromsø on 5 August 1912. On 13 August 1912 the Herzog Ernst was halted by pack ice three miles beyond Nordaustlandet's North Cape. On 15 August 1912 Schröder-Stranz and three crew members disembarked and tried to cross the pack ice, ten miles away from the nearest mainland, with kayaks and sledges. This was the last time Schröder-Stranz was seen alive, only seven out of 15 members of his crew survived the following winter.
