= Strączno =

- Village
- Location within Poland
- Coordinates: 53°15′N 16°23′E
- Country: Poland
- Voivodeship: West Pomeranian
- County: Wałcz
- Gmina: Wałcz

Strączno [ˈstrɔnt͡ʂnɔ] (German: Stranz) is a village in the administrative district of Gmina Wałcz, within Wałcz County, West Pomeranian Voivodeship, in north-western Poland. It lies approximately 6 km (4 mi) west of Wałcz and 122 km (76 mi) east of the regional capital Szczecin.

== Notable residents ==
- Herbert Schröder-Stranz (1884–1912), German arctic explorer
