= Chilean corvette General Baquedano =

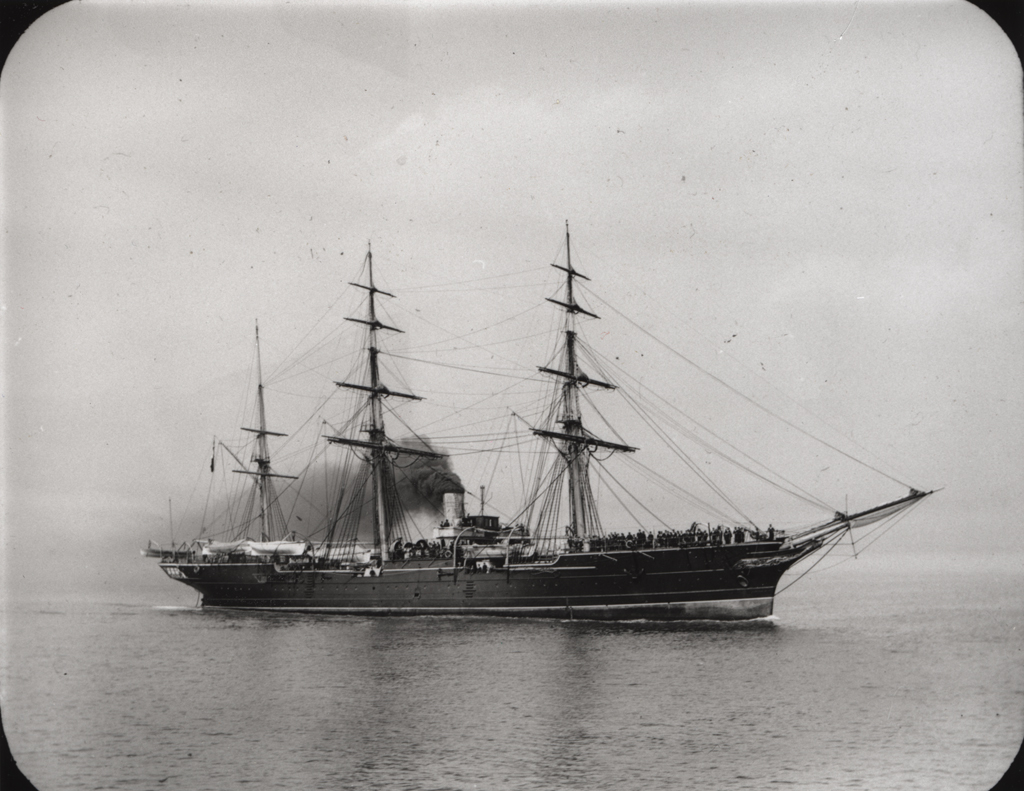
- Corvette Baquedano

History

Chile
- Name: General Baquedano
- Namesake: Manuel Baquedano
- Builder: Armstrong Whitworth
- Launched: 5 July 1898
- Commissioned: 22 August 1899
- Decommissioned: 15 December 1959
- Notes: Also known as La chancha

General characteristics
- Displacement: 2500 t
- Length: 240 ft (73.2 m)
- Depth: 18 ft (5.5 m)
- Propulsion: 1,500 HP, Belleville boiler
- Sail plan: corvette
- Speed: 13.75 knots (25.47 km/h; 15.82 mph)
- Crew: 333

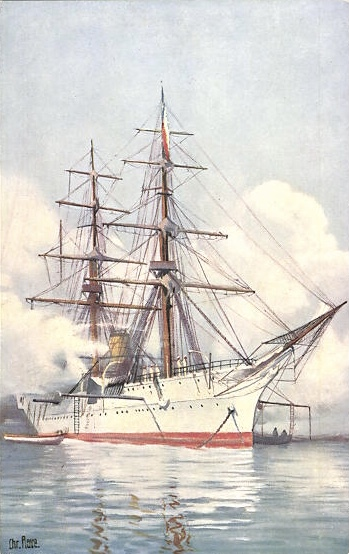
Baquedano by Christopher Rave

General Baquedano was the first training ship of the Chilean Navy ordered specifically for this purpose. She replaced in this function the old Abtao and Pilcomayo.

From 1922 to 1926 she was refitted in Talcahuano. She continued to serve as training ship until 1935.

== In the literature ==
Francisco Coloane wrote the novel El último grumete de la Baquedano (The last deckboy of the Baquedano).

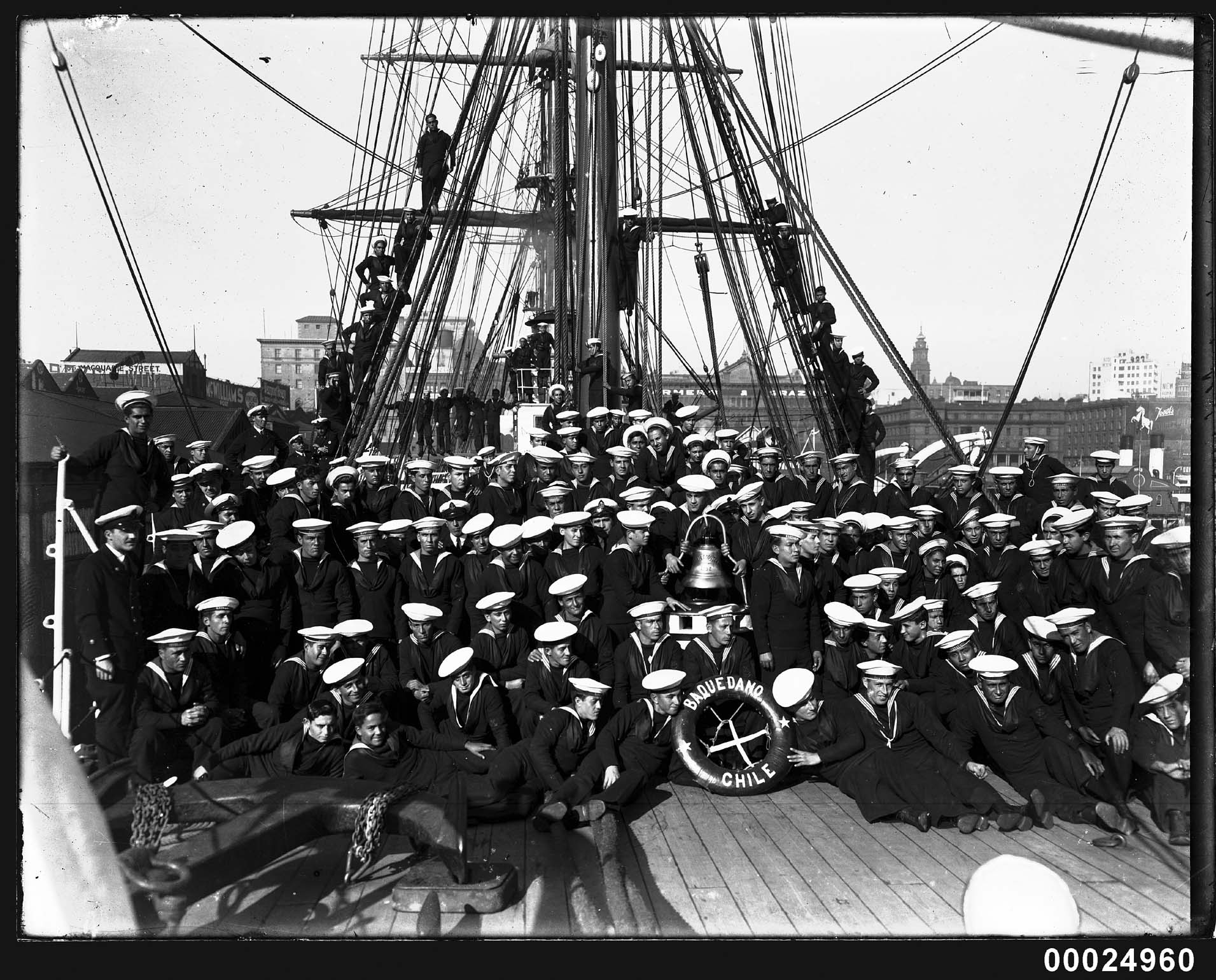
The crew of the General Baquedano while on a visit to Sydney, July 1931
