= Szwecja =

- Village
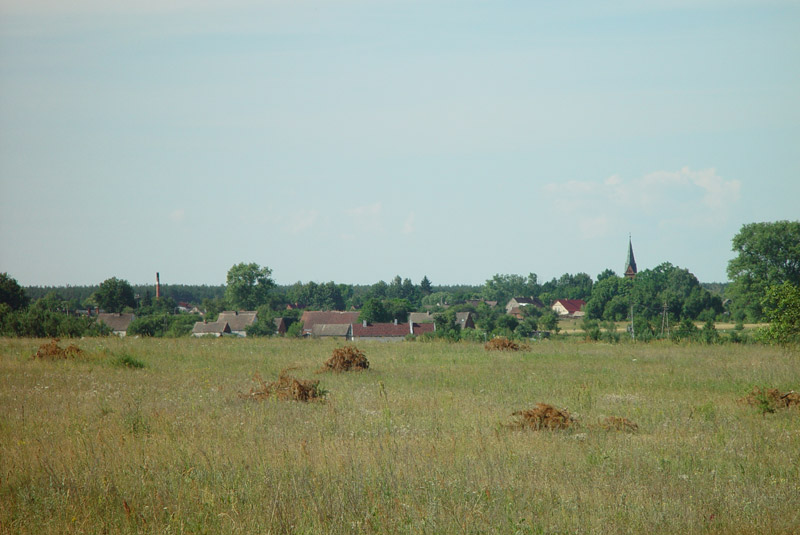
- Panorama of the village

- Location within Poland
- Coordinates: 53°20′53″N 16°34′24″E
- Country: Poland
- Voivodeship: West Pomeranian
- County: Wałcz
- Gmina: Wałcz
- Population: 800

Szwecja (Polish: [ˈʂfɛt͡sja]; German: Freudenfier) is a village in the administrative district of Gmina Wałcz, within Wałcz County, West Pomeranian Voivodeship, in north-western Poland. It lies approximately 12 km (7 mi) north-east of Wałcz and 133 km (83 mi) east of the regional capital Szczecin.

The village has a population of 800.
