= Morzyca, Wałcz County =

Morzyca
- Village
- Location within Poland
- Coordinates: 53°16′28″N 16°26′12″E
- Country: Poland
- Voivodeship: West Pomeranian
- County: Wałcz
- Gmina: Wałcz

Morzyca [mɔˈʐɨt͡sa] (German: Moritzhof) is a part of the town Wałcz, within Wałcz County, West Pomeranian Voivodeship, in north-western Poland.
