= Rudki, West Pomeranian Voivodeship =

Rudki
- Village
- Location within Poland
- Coordinates: 53°24′N 16°22′E
- Country: Poland
- Voivodeship: West Pomeranian
- County: Wałcz
- Gmina: Wałcz

Rudki (Polish pronunciation: ['rutki]; German: Hoffstädt) is a village in the administrative district of Gmina Wałcz, within Wałcz County, West Pomeranian Voivodeship, in north-western Poland. It lies approximately 17 km (11 mi) north-west of Wałcz and 119 km (74 mi) east of the regional capital Szczecin.
