= Christopher Rave =

German painter (1881–1933)

Christopher Rave (20 February 1881 – 13 January 1933) was a German painter, explorer of polar regions and professor.

== Career ==
Rave was a painter of marine art living in Hamburg. Between 1900 and 1909, he created about 300 paintings about 8,000 years of navigation. In 1911, they were exhibited in Hamburg and sold in particular. The paintings were reproduced as postcards by two publishers, one from Hamburg, the other one from the Netherlands.

In 1910, he experienced the accident of the German tall ship Preußen as a passenger, running aground close to Dover.

In 1912, he was a member of the German exploration voyage to Spitsbergen. His task was documentation by photographs and paintings. The voyage, under the command of Herbert Schröder-Stranz and Alfred Ritscher as captain of the ship Herzog Ernst, failed, and just seven out of fifteen crew survived. In 1913, Rave published his experiences Tagebuch von der verunglückten Expedition Schröder-Stranz: mit Federzeichnungen vom Verfasser (Diary of the Failed Expedition of Schröder-Stranz).

== Death ==
Having cancer of the throat and hardly able to talk, Rave shot himself on 13 January 1933. His tomb, designed by his student Valentin Kraus from Munich, is in the Hamburg Ohlsdorf Cemetery.

== Paintings (selection) ==
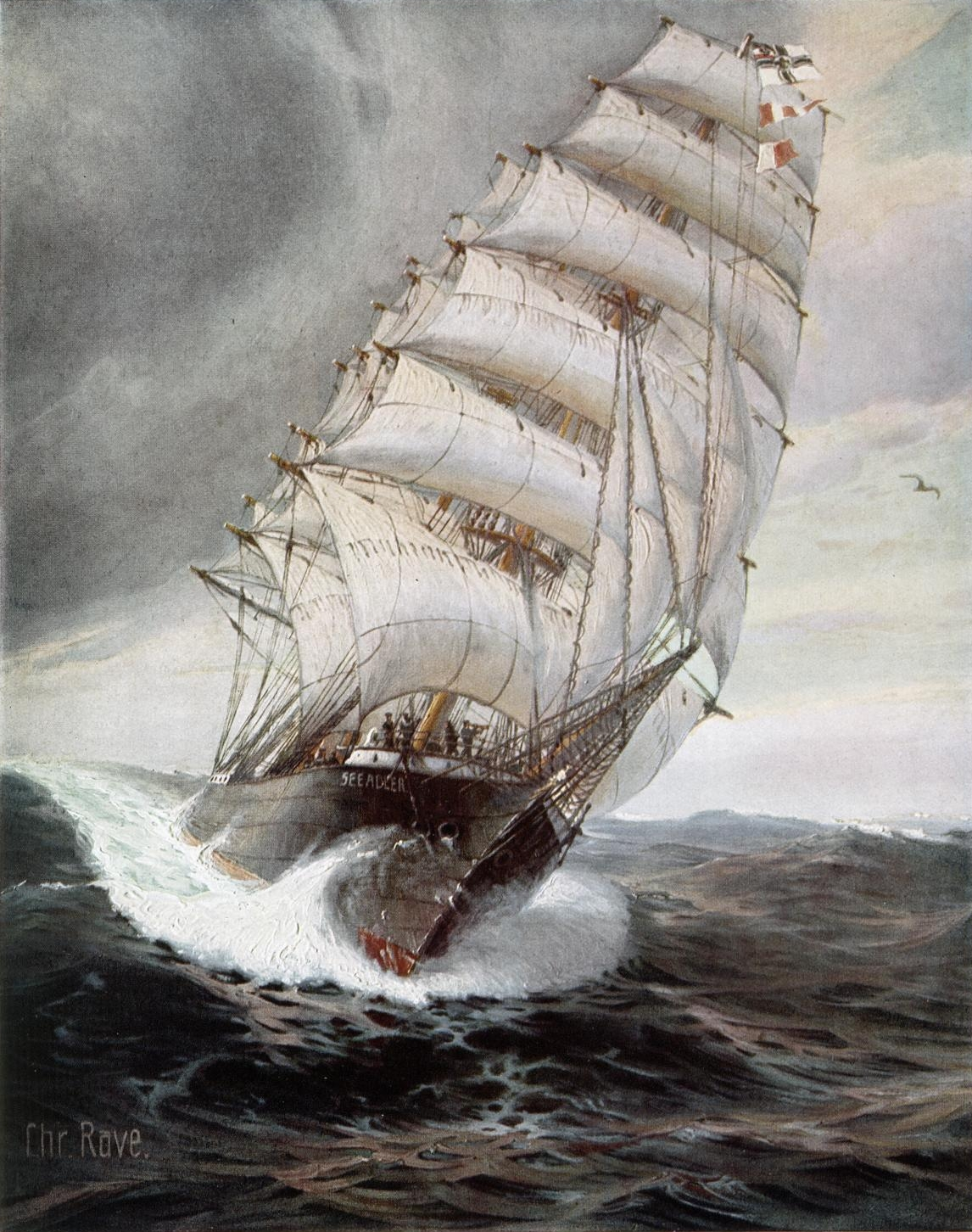
SMS Seeadler

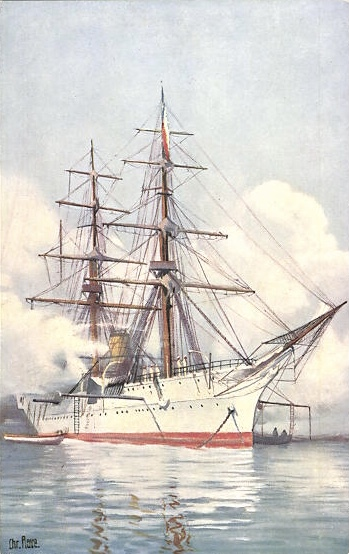
Baquedano (1898) by Rave

- Die brandenburgische Flotte vor Emden, Format 4.80 m × 3.50 m, property of Kunsthalle Hamburg
- SMS Seeadler, oil, before 1924, possibly several copies
- Dampfwalfangschiff im nördlichen Eismeer, oil on canvas, 60 cm × 100 cm, 1910
- T.S. "CAP ARCONA" auf See, oil on wood, 37 × 51 cm
- Altes Land im rötlichen Winterlicht, oil on canvas, 60 × 100 cm

== Books ==
- Tagebuch von der verunglückten Expedition Schröder-Stranz: mit Federzeichnungen vom Verfasser, Schaffstein, Köln 1913
- Illustrationen und Fotos in: Hermann Rüdiger: Die Sorge-Bai: Aus den Schicksalstagen der Schröder-Stranz-Expedition, 46 Bilder und 5 Tafeln nach Zeichnungen und photographischen Aufnahmen Christopher Rave, Reimer, Berlin 1913, Nachdruck: Edition Fines Mundi, Saarbrücken 2007
