= Chude, Poland =

Chude
- Village
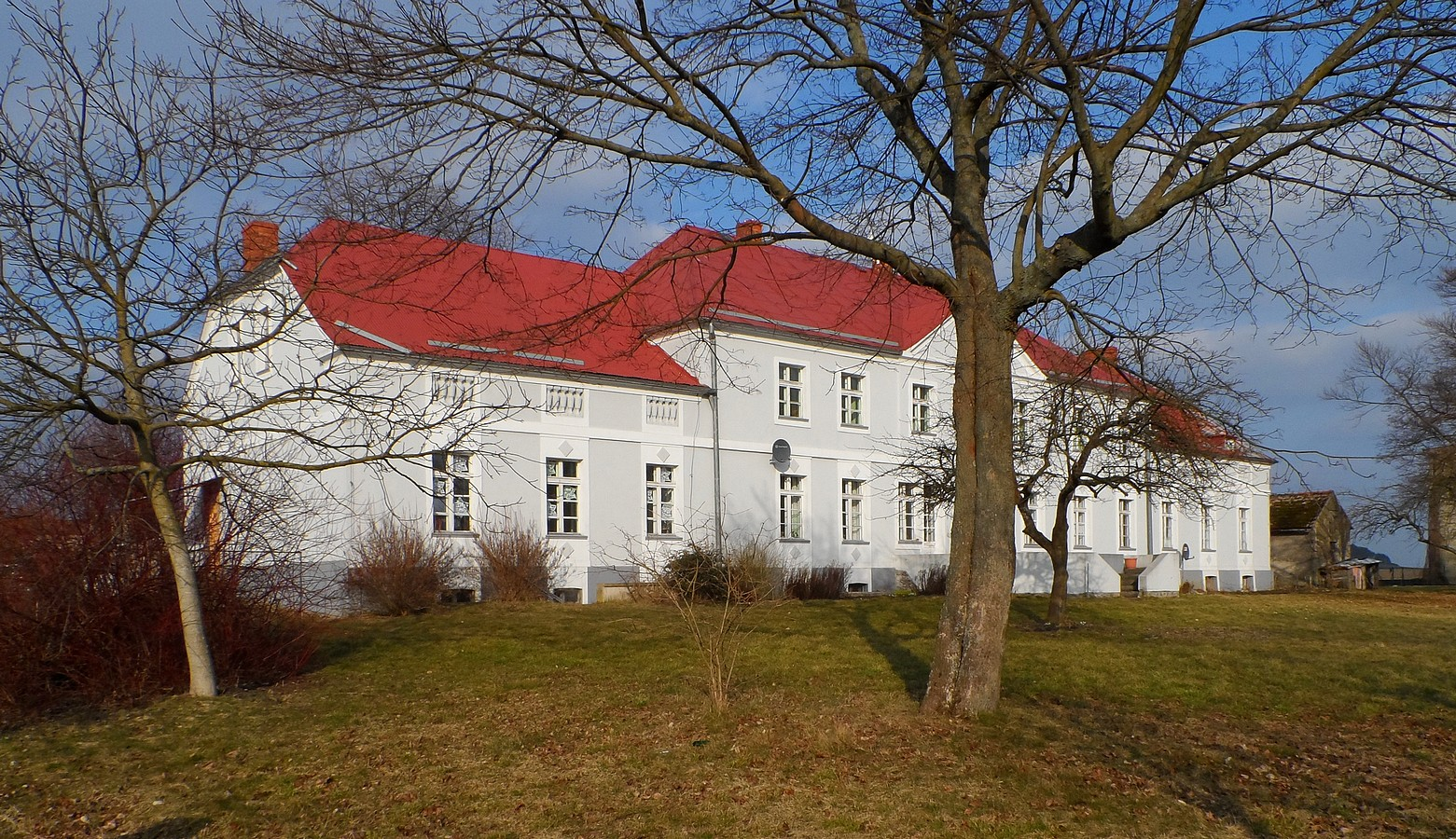
- Chude Palace

- Location within Poland
- Coordinates: 53°14′15″N 16°36′36″E
- Country: Poland
- Voivodeship: Greater Poland
- County: Piła
- Gmina: Gmina Szydłowo

Population
  - Total: 220
- Time zone: UTC+1 (CET)
  - Summer (DST): UTC+2 (CEST)
- Vehicle registration: ZWA

Chude [ˈxudɛ] is a village in the administrative district of Gmina Szydłowo, within Wałcz County, West Pomeranian Voivodeship, in north-western Poland. It lies approximately 11 km (7 mi) west of Piła and 126 km (78 mi) west of the regional capital Poznań.
