= Golce, West Pomeranian Voivodeship =

Golce
- Village
- Location within Poland
- Coordinates: 53°22′15″N 16°25′40″E
- Country: Poland
- Voivodeship: West Pomeranian
- County: Wałcz
- Gmina: Wałcz

Golce [ˈɡɔlt͡sɛ] (German: Neugolz) is a village in the administrative district of Gmina Wałcz, within Wałcz County, West Pomeranian Voivodeship, in north-western Poland. It lies approximately 12 km (7 mi) north of Wałcz and 123 km (76 mi) east of the voivodeship capital Szczecin. Golce are inhabited by approximately 300 people.
