= Olszynka, West Pomeranian Voivodeship =

Olszynka
- Village
- Location within Poland
- Coordinates: 53°18′04″N 16°27′27″E
- Country: Poland
- Voivodeship: West Pomeranian
- County: Wałcz
- Gmina: Wałcz (town)

Olszynka [ɔlˈʂɨŋka] (German: Elsenfeld) is a part of the town Wałcz, within Wałcz County, West Pomeranian Voivodeship, in north-western Poland.
