= Czapla, West Pomeranian Voivodeship =

Czapla
- Village
- Location within Poland
- Coordinates: 53°16′4″N 16°36′38″E
- Country: Poland
- Voivodeship: West Pomeranian
- County: Wałcz
- Gmina: Wałcz

Czapla [ˈt͡ʂapla] (German: Neumühl) is a village in the administrative district of Gmina Wałcz, within Wałcz County, West Pomeranian Voivodeship, in north-western Poland. It lies approximately 10 km (6 mi) east of Wałcz and 136 km (85 mi) east of the regional capital Szczecin.
