= Czapla (surname) =

Czapla is a Polish surname. It may refer to:

- Adrianna Czapla (born 1999), Polish middle-distance runner
- Krzysztof Czapla (born 1956), Polish diplomat
- Łukasz Czapla (born 1982), Polish sport shooter
- Marian Czapla (1946–2016), Polish painter and graphic artist
