= Karsibór, Wałcz County =

Karsibór
- Village
- Location within Poland
- Coordinates: 53°21′25″N 16°25′0″E
- Country: Poland
- Voivodeship: West Pomeranian
- County: Wałcz
- Gmina: Wałcz
- Elevation: 120 m (390 ft)
- Population: 930

Karsibór [karˈɕibur] (German: Keßburg) is a village in the administrative district of Gmina Wałcz, within Wałcz County, West Pomeranian Voivodeship, in north-western Poland. It lies approximately 11 km (7 mi) north of Wałcz and 122 km (76 mi) east of the regional capital Szczecin.

The village has a population of 930.
