= Krzysztof Czapla =

Polish diplomat

- Born: 1956 (age 69–70)
- Education: Moscow State Institute of International Relations
- Title: Consul-General in Benghazi (1995–1998); Consul-General in Vancouver (2001–2005); Consul-General in Vancouver (2009–2013); Chargé d'affaires to Syria (2016–2021)

Krzysztof Andrzej Czapla (born 1956) is a retired Polish diplomat

== Life ==
Krzysztof Czapla graduated from the Moscow State Institute of International Relations. Following an internship at the Polish Consulate-General in Benghazi, in 1984, he began working at the Ministry of Foreign Affairs. The following year, he was made to leave the Ministry for political reasons. Afterwards, he has been working for Mostostal in Libya as a translator.

After the regime change in Poland, in 1991, Czapla returned to the Ministry. Between 1995 and 1998 he was serving as Consul-General in Benghazi. In 1999, he was successfully negotiating releasing Polish nurses in Libya detained for alleged spreading HIV. He was twice Consul-General in Vancouver: from 2001 to 2005 and from 2009 to 2013 (during the 2010 Winter Olympics). In a meantime, at the Ministry headquarter in Warsaw he was working at the Bureau of Control and Audit and at the Consular Department. Since April 2016 he served as chargé d'affaires to Syria, residing in Beirut. In 2018, he was responsible for releasing journalist Witold Repetowicz. In 2021, he ended his term and retired.

Besides Polish, he speaks Arabic, English and Russian languages.
