= Pomeranian Wall =

Line of fortifications in Nazi Germany

The Pomeranian Wall
- Die Pommernstellung
- Pomeranian Lakeland, Poland
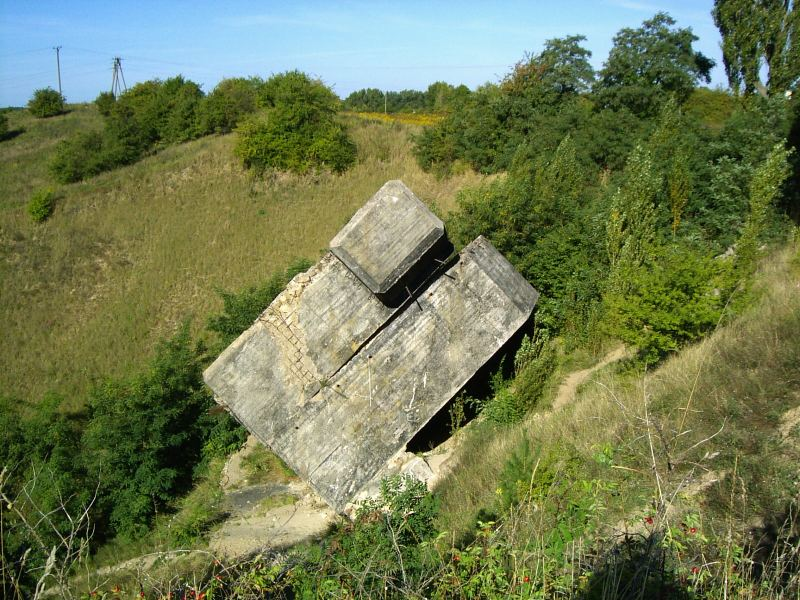
- One of the wall's bunkers around Wałcz, 2008

Site information
- Type: Fortification

Site history
- Built: 1932-1937
- Built by: German Army
- In use: 1932–1945
- Battles/wars: World War II

The Pomeranian Wall, Pomeranian Line or Pomeranian Position (German: Die Pommernstellung, Polish: Wał Pomorski) was a line of fortifications constructed by Nazi Germany in the Pomeranian Lakeland region in modern north-western Poland.

It was constructed in two phases. In the years 1932-1937 it was constructed as a light defensive position in case of an attack from the Second Polish Republic against the German republic. The line of fortifications stretched from Landsberg an der Warthe (Gorzów Wielkopolski) to Baldenburg (Biały Bór) and Pollnow (Polanów). The fortifications had several impressive strong points, particularly near Deutsch-Krone (Wałcz) and the 'Hangman Mountain'.

The second phase took place during the Second World War, in 1944, when after a series of defeats on the Eastern Front the Pomeranian Wall was renovated in order to stop the Red Army advance. Various battles along the Pomeranian Wall took place particularly from January to March 1945, for example, the Battle of Kolberg, with the Red Army and units of the Polish People's Army eventually breaking through the wall in various places.

The southern part of the position, near the Netze (Noteć) river, was known as the Noteć Line (Wall, Position) - Netzestellung, Wał Noteci.

== History ==
=== Construction ===
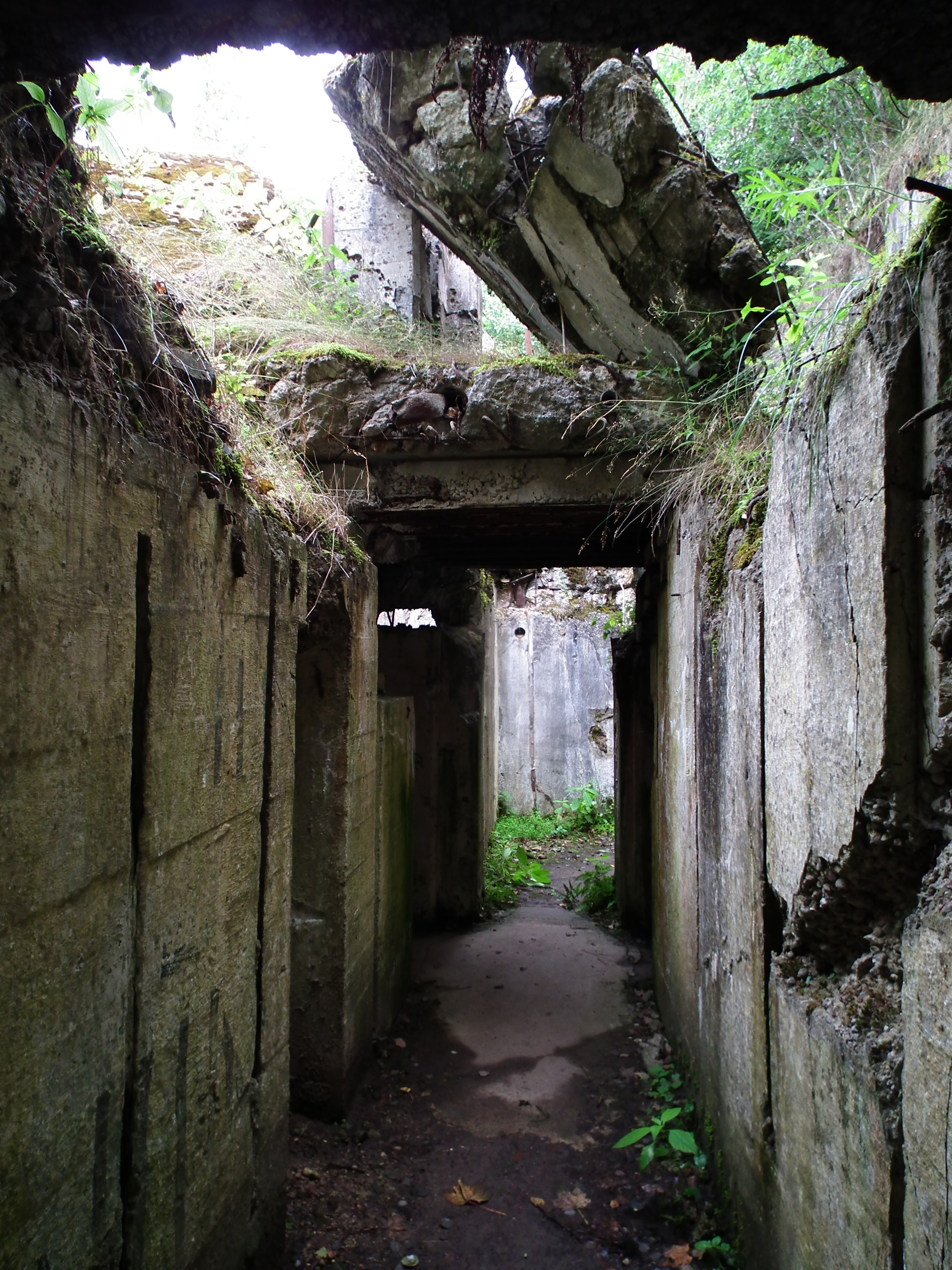
Concrete remains of the wall at Mount Śmiadowska, 2019.

After World War I, Germany was forced to cede territory to Poland, leading to the creation of a Polish corridor separating Pomerania from East Prussia. Germany began constructing the Pomeranian Wall in 1932 on their side of the coridor in Pomerania to defend their positions in case of a Polish attack. Fortifications took advantage of the landscape dominated by small lakes. In total, about 900 buildings were constructed as part of the wall, with its concrete bunkers being similar to the arch bunkers of the Festungsfront Oder-Warthe-Bogen. Under the new Nazi government, the wall saw extensions to near Neustettin, and the area between Vilzsee and Dolgensee in 1934. At Tütz Castle, its embarkment was reinforced with concrete bunkers between 1934 and 1937. Work on the wall ended in 1937 to concentrate more focus on the Siegfried Line in the west. It was not until 1944 that work resumed. Key points along the lines were at Neustettin and Deutsch-Krone.

=== World War II ===
==== 1944 renovations ====
By September 1944, the German army had been pushed back by the advancing Red Army; Army Group North was in a dangerous position and the chance that the Soviets would increase attacks on German positions along the Baltic Sea increased. Shortly after the 20 July Plot against Adolf Hitler, Franz Schwede ordered work on the line to resume as the Gauleiter and Reich Defense Commissioner of Gau Pomerania.

The renovated defenses were never designed to repel Soviet attacks, but instead designed to be of being capable of resisting the Soviets long enough to slow their advance and inflict massive casualties. The renovations saw the addition of underground tunnels, as well as positions for anti-tank, artillery and machine-guns.

Additionally, the new fortifications included anti-tank ditches that were 3.5 metres (11 ft) deep, 4 metres (13 ft) wide at the surface and 0.5 metres (1.6 ft) at the bottom. These ditches were mainly dug by young people aged 14–16, women and older men. Farmers were sometimes also forced to help out. The digging occurred prior to the establishment of the Volkssturm that expanded conscription.

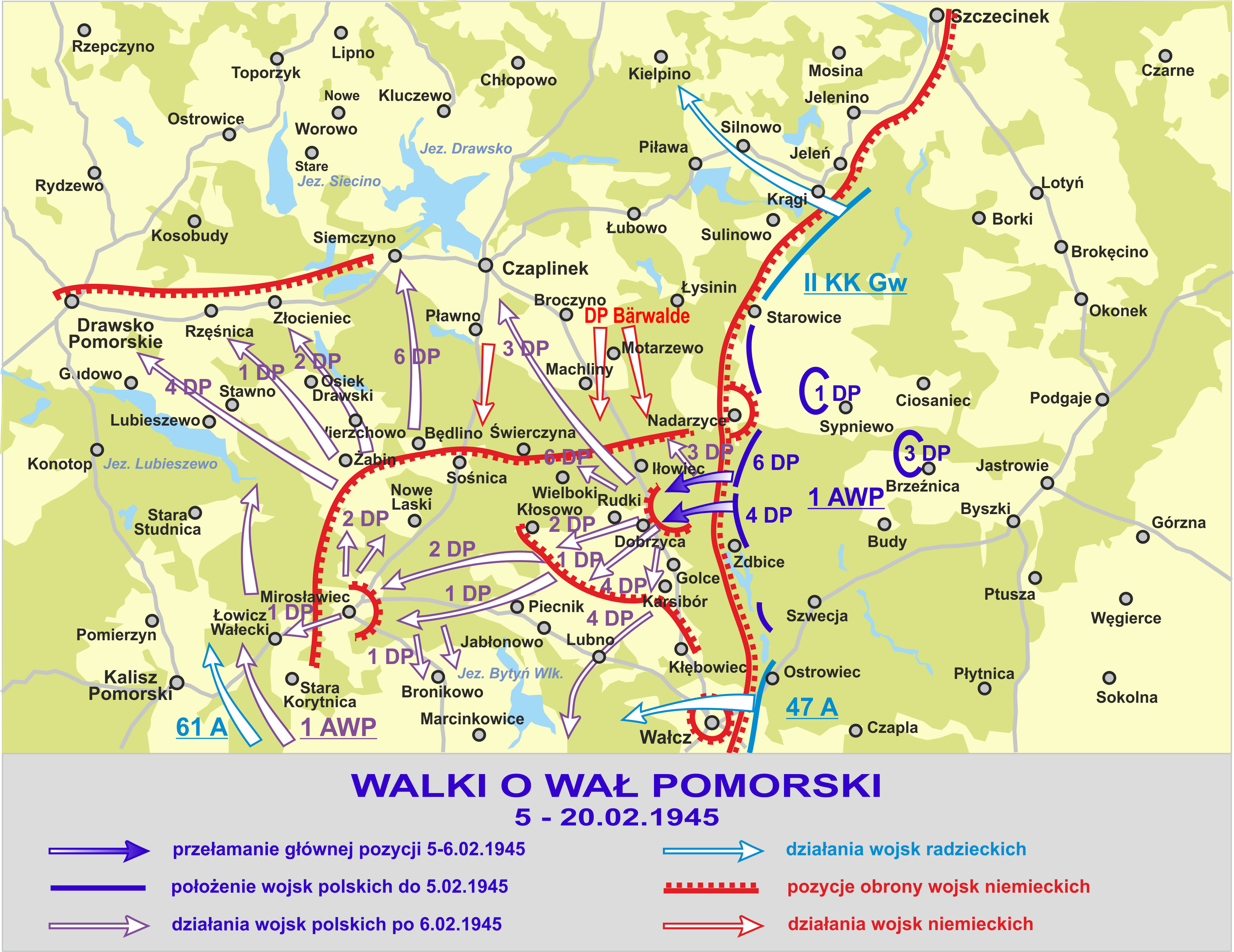
Map of engagements on the Pomeranian Wall in 1945. Blue and light blue arrows represent Polish and Soviet advances respectively, whilst the red lines represent the German positions taken along the wall.

==== Soviet Offensive ====
By early 1945, the Red Army had advanced across Poland and into East Prussia. Before the Soviets could make a push towards the German capital of Berlin, it became necessary for the remaining German positions in Pomerania and West Prussia to be dealt with. In February 1945, the 2nd Byelorussian Front advanced towards the port city of Danzig. The offensive in East Pomerania saw the Germans becoming encircled around Danzig. Besides Danzig, the offensive sought to seize the Arnswalde and Kolberg areas. Kolberg, a port city, was a key German position on the Pomeranian Wall and had been hoped to be used as a point to supply nearby troops.

The advancing Soviet-Polish forces largely ignored the Pomeranian Wall's defences. The wall was first breeched by the Soviets at Hochzeit on January 28, and again at Baldenburg on February 26. Złotów, a town on the line, fell to the 4th Infantry Division of the 1st Polish Army on January 31. Kolberg was surrounded by Soviet-Polish forces on March 4 and fell on March 18 after much of the military personnel and civilians in the city had been evacuated. The line did little to slow the Soviet advance.

=== Post-war ===
Many of the bunkers of the former Pomeranian Wall remain intact surrounded by forests in Poland. Between 1966 and 1976, Tuczno (Tütz) Castle was restored after sustaining damage during the war. Also, many of the old vaults have provided shelter for bat populations. The bunkers at Oder-Warta bend is among the largest man-made bat roosts in Europe, providing shelter for over 35,000 bats in the winter. Within the entire former line, twelve species have been detected with the main types being mouse-eared bats, fringed myotis and Daubenton's bats.

== Gallery ==
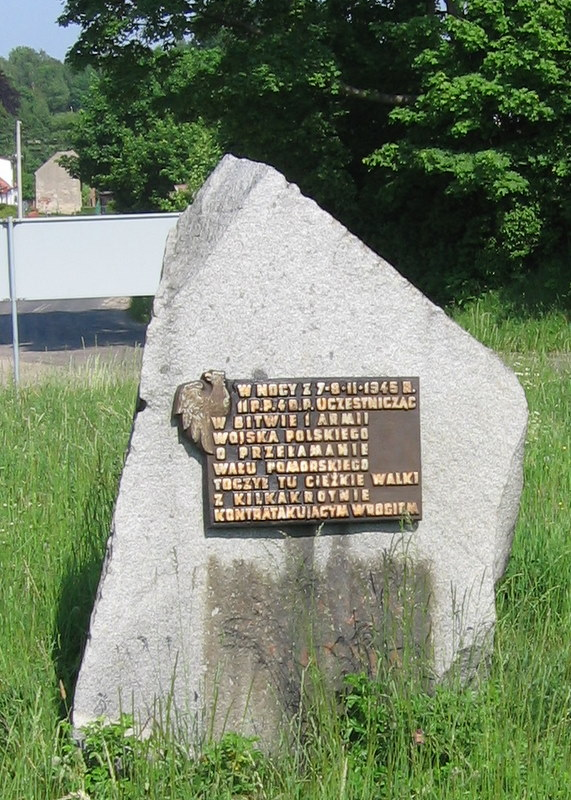
Memorial plaque in Golce

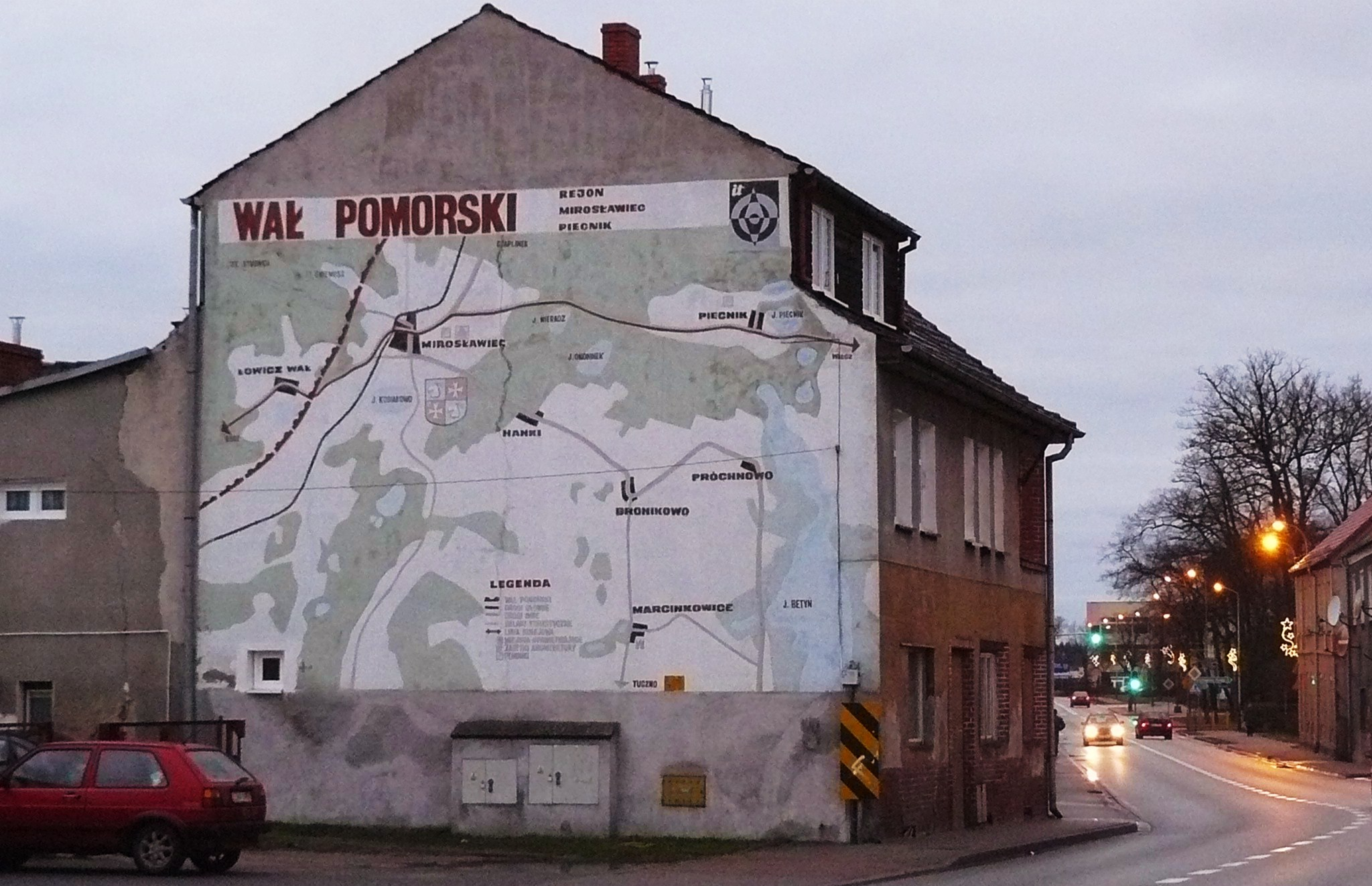
Mural in Mirosławiec

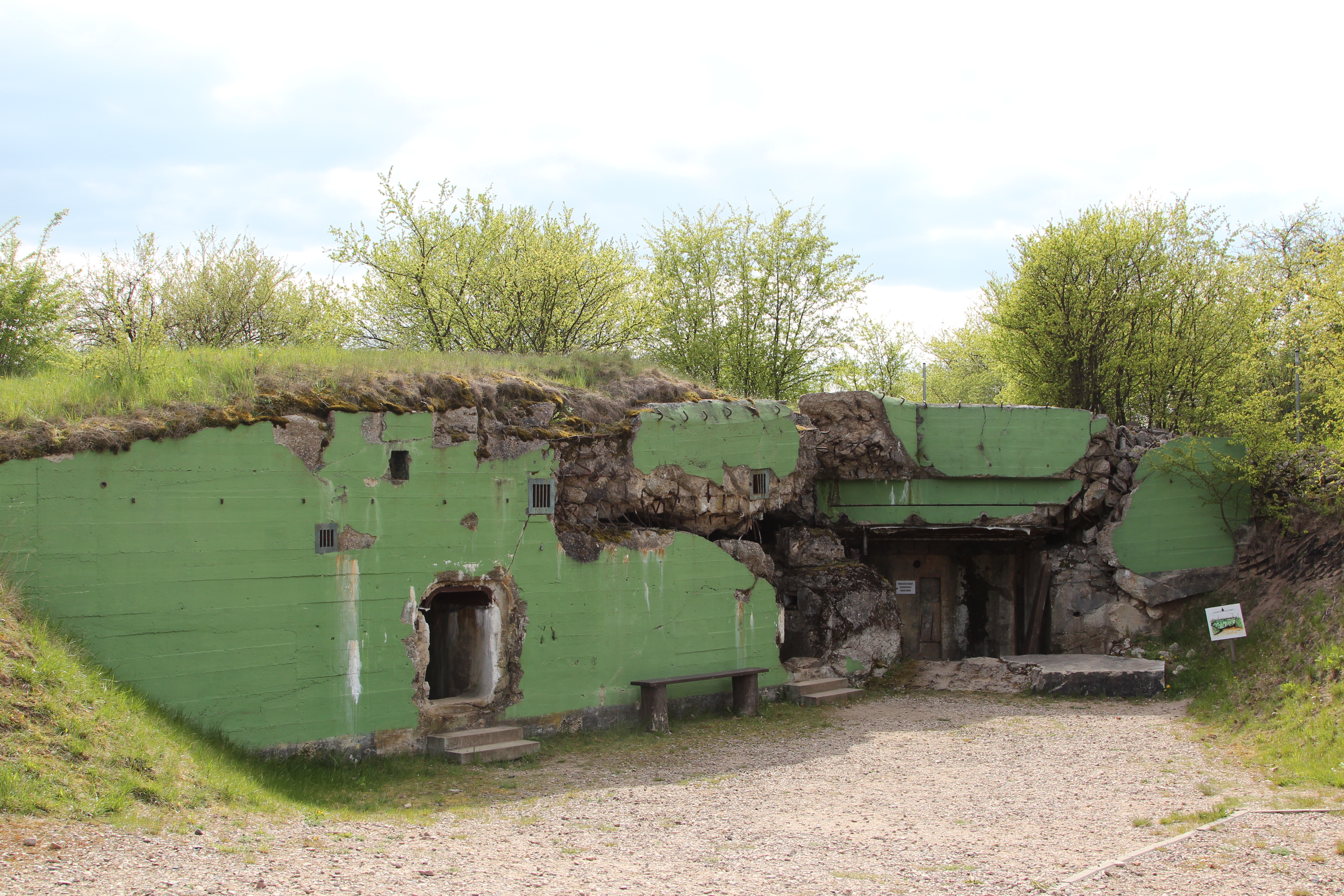
Surviving bunker around Wałcz

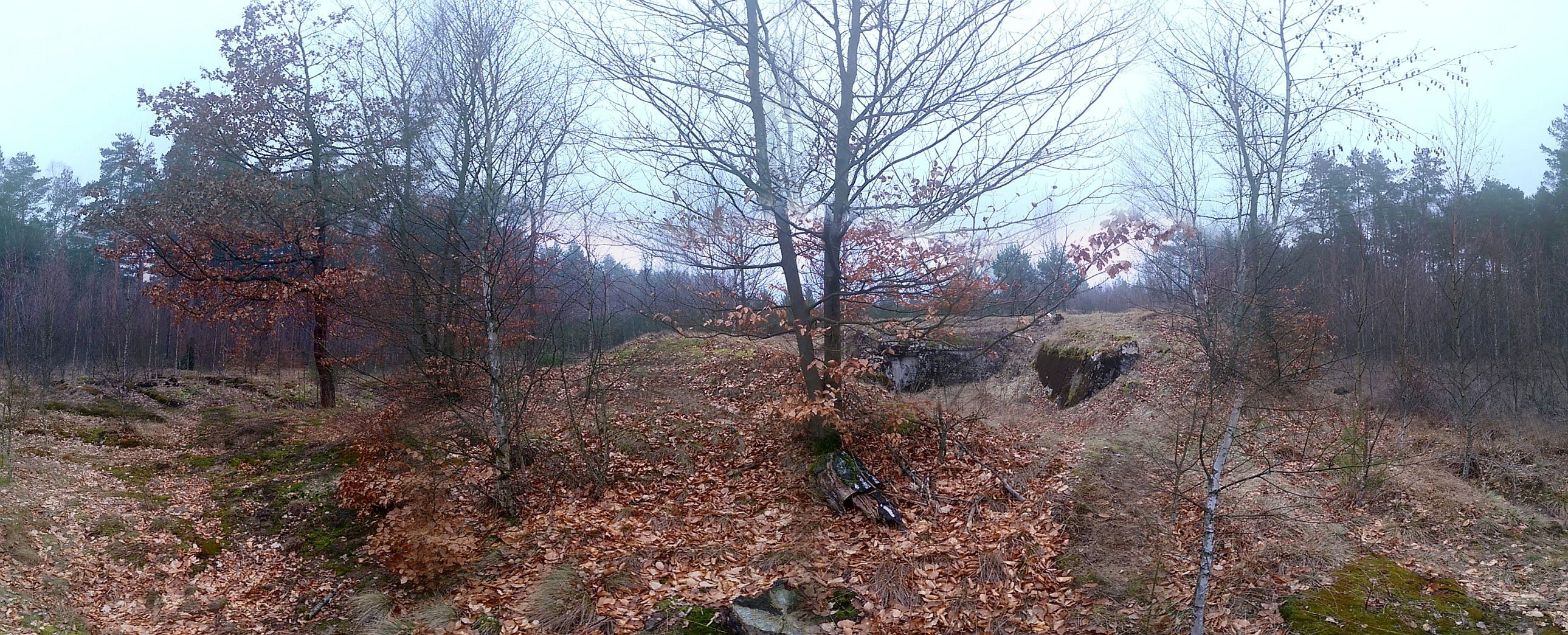
Bunker remnants in the autumn

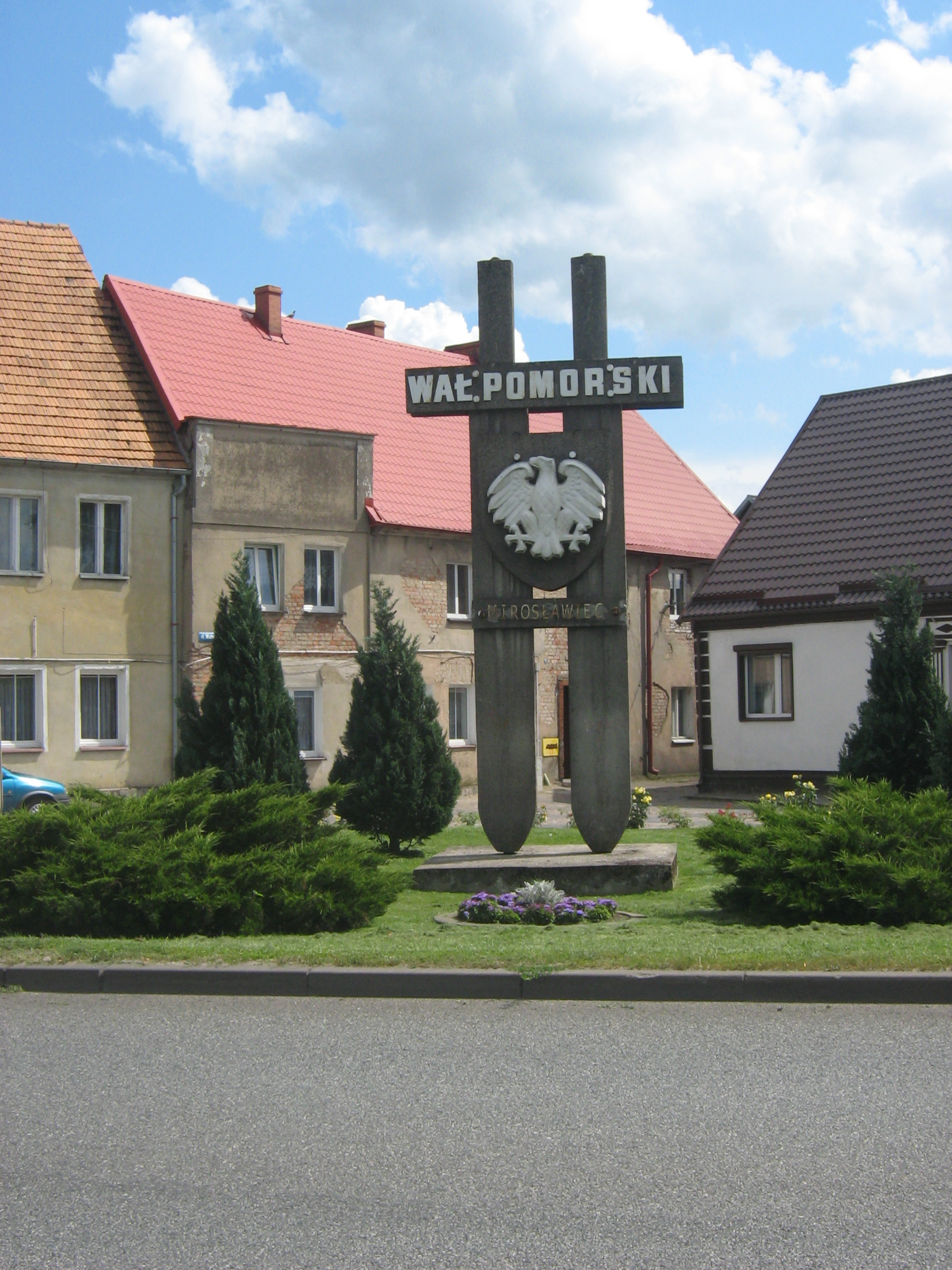
Memorial in Mirosławiec
