= List of shipwrecks in July 1915 =

The list of shipwrecks in July 1915 includes ships sunk, foundered, grounded, or otherwise lost during July 1915.

== 1 July ==
List of shipwrecks: 1 July 1915
Ship	State	Description
Caucasian	United Kingdom	World War I: The tanker was shelled and sunk in the Atlantic Ocean 80 nautical miles (150 km) south west of The Lizard, Cornwall by SM U-39 (Imperial German Navy). Her 38 crew survived.
Craigard	United Kingdom	World War I: The cargo ship was torpedoed and sunk in the Atlantic Ocean 50 nautical miles (93 km) south west by south of the Wolf Rock, Cornwall (48°18′N 6°10′W) by SM U-39 (Imperial German Navy). Her crew survived.
Gadsby	United Kingdom	World War I: The cargo ship was torpedoed and sunk in the Atlantic Ocean 25 nautical miles (46 km) south south west of the Wolf Rock (49°23′N 5°52′W) by SM U-39 (Imperial German Navy). Her crew survived.
Inglemoor	United Kingdom	World War I: The collier was torpedoed and sunk in the Atlantic Ocean 75 nautical miles (139 km) south west by west of The Lizard by SM U-39 (Imperial German Navy). Her 33 crew survived.
L. C. Tower	United Kingdom	World War I: The schooner was intercepted, set afire, and sunk in the Atlantic Ocean off the Fastnet Rock (50°56′N 10°04′W) by SM U-24 (Imperial German Navy). Her crew survived.
Richmond	United Kingdom	World War I: The cargo ship was shelled and sunk in the Atlantic Ocean 54 nautical miles (100 km) south west by west of the Wolf Rock 49°11′N 6°10′W) by SM U-39 (Imperial German Navy). Her crew survived.
Sardomene	Italy	World War I: The full-rigged ship was sunk in the Atlantic Ocean 35 nautical miles (65 km) south west of the Fastnet Rock by SM U-24 (Imperial German Navy).
Welbury	United Kingdom	World War I: The cargo ship was shelled and sunk in the Atlantic Ocean 40 nautical miles (74 km) west of the Fastnet Rock by SM U-24 (Imperial German Navy). Her crew survived.

== 2 July ==
List of shipwrecks: 2 July 1915
Ship	State	Description
SMS Albatross	Imperial German Navy	World War I: Battle of Åland Islands:The Nautilus class was shelled and damaged by Admiral Makarov, Bayan, Bogatyr, and Oleg all (Imperial Russian Navy) and beached on Gotland. Later refloated and scrapped.
Boudougnat	Belgium	World War I: The cargo ship was torpedoed and sunk in the English Channel south of Lizard Point, Cornwall, United Kingdom 949°11′N 5°36′W) by SM U-39 (Imperial German Navy). Her crew survived.
Eva	United Kingdom	The schooner departed Wicklow for the River Mersey. Presumed foundered in the Irish Sea with the loss of all hands. Wreckage from the vessel washed up on Anglesey.
Hirondelle	France	World War I: The sailing vessel was sunk in the English Channel 40 nautical miles (74 km) north of Ouessant, Finistère (49°10′N 5°46′W) by SM U-39 (Imperial German Navy).
17 OS	Regia Marina	World War I: The PN-class torpedo boat struck one of her own mines and sank in the Adriatic Sea off the Istrian Peninsula, Austria-Hungary.

== 3 July ==
List of shipwrecks: 3 July 1915
Ship	State	Description
Fiery Cross	Norway	World War I: The barque was scuttled in the Atlantic Ocean 70 nautical miles (130 km) west south west of the Isles of Scilly, United Kingdom (48°55′N 7°25′W) by SM U-39 (Imperial German Navy). Her crew survived.
Larchmore	United Kingdom	World War I: The cargo ship was shelled and sunk in the Atlantic Ocean 70 nautical miles (130 km) south west of the Wolf Rock, Cornwall (48°54′N 6°28′W) by SM U-39 (Imperial German Navy) with the loss of a crew member.
Renfrew	United Kingdom	World War I: The cargo ship was shelled and sunk in the Atlantic Ocean 85 nautical miles (157 km) south west by west of the Wolf Rock by SM U-39 (Imperial German Navy). Her crew survived.

== 4 July ==
List of shipwrecks: 4 July 1915
Ship	State	Description
Carthage	France	World War I: The passenger ship was sunk off Cape Helles, Turkey by SM U-21 (Imperial German Navy). There were six casualties.
Oscar II	Sweden	The cargo ship collided with another vessel in the Atlantic Ocean 80 nautical miles (150 km) west of the Butt of Lewis, Outer Hebrides, United Kingdom and was abandoned by her crew.
Sunbeam	United Kingdom	World War I: The three-masted schooner was shelled and sunk in the North Sea 16 nautical miles (30 km) east of Wick, Caithness by SM U-25 (Imperial German Navy). Her crew survived.

== 5 July ==
List of shipwrecks: 5 July 1915
Ship	State	Description
No. 5	Ottoman Navy	World War I: The No. 1 class Motor Gunboat was lost on this date.
Peik	Norway	World War I: The cargo ship struck a mine and sank in the North Sea 1.5 nautical miles (2.8 km) off the Longsand Lightship (United Kingdom). Her crew survived.

== 6 July ==
List of shipwrecks: 6 July 1915
Ship	State	Description
HMS African Monarch	Royal Navy	World War I: The collier struck a mine and sank in the White Sea with the loss of two of her crew.
HMT Edison	Royal Navy	The naval trawler was wrecked in the Isle of Lewis, Outer Hebrides.
Ellen	Denmark	World War I: The three-masted schooner was scuttled in the North Sea 60 nautical miles (110 km) south west of Lindesnes, Lister og Mandal county, Norway (57°18′N 6°25′E) by SM U-24 (Imperial German Navy). Her crew survived.
HMT Strathgarry	Royal Navy	The boom vessel, a naval trawler, was sunk in a collision with HMS Monarch (Royal Navy) in Hoxa Sound, Scapa Flow.

== 7 July ==
List of shipwrecks: 7 July 1915
Ship	State	Description
Amalfi	Regia Marina	World War I: The Pisa-class armored cruiser was torpedoed and sunk at Pola, Austria-Hungary by SM UB-14 (Imperial German Navy) with the loss of 67 of her 684 crew.
Cheshire	United Kingdom	World War I: The trawler struck a mine and sank in the North Sea 508 nautical miles (941 km) east by south of Spurn Point, Yorkshire with the loss of eight of her crew.
Convoy	United States	The tow steamer was struck by a gale opposite the mouth of Mill Creek, Cleveland, Ohio that tore off her pilot house and caused her to capsize and sink. Six crew were killed.

== 8 July ==
List of shipwrecks: 8 July 1915
Ship	State	Description
Anna	Russia	World War I: The cargo ship was sunk in the North Sea 35 nautical miles (65 km) north east by east of Kinnaird Head, Aberdeenshire, United Kingdom by SM U-25 (Imperial German Navy).
Guido	United Kingdom	World War I: The cargo ship was torpedoed and sunk in the North Sea 27 nautical miles (50 km) north east of Rattray Head, Aberdeenshire (58°03′N 1°28′W) by SM U-25 (Imperial German Navy). Her crew survived.
Marion Lightbody	Russia	World War I: The four-masted full-rigged ship was sunk in the Atlantic Ocean (50°53′N 8°43′W by SM U-20 (Imperial German Navy).

== 9 July ==
List of shipwrecks: 9 July 1915
Ship	State	Description
Ellesmere	United Kingdom	World War I: The cargo ship was torpedoed and sunk in St. George's Channel 48 nautical miles (89 km) south west of the Smalls Lighthouse by SM U-20 (Imperial German Navy) with the loss of one of her 22 crew. Survivors were rescued by the trawler Osprey (United Kingdom).
Leo	Russia	World War I: The tanker was sunk in St. George's Channel 48 nautical miles (89 km) south west of the Smalls Lighthouse (51°07′N 7°10′W) by SM U-20 (Imperial German Navy) with the loss of seven of her twenty crew.
Meadowfield	United Kingdom	World War I: The cargo ship was shelled and sunk in St. George's Channel 50 nautical miles (93 km) south west of the Tuskar Rock by SM U-20 (Imperial German Navy) with the loss of a crew member.
Noordas	Norway	World War I: The cargo ship was sunk in the North Sea 30 nautical miles (56 km) east of Aberdeen, United Kingdom (56°58′N 1°07′W) by SM U-25 (Imperial German Navy). Her sixteen crew survived.

== 11 July ==
List of shipwrecks: 11 July 1915
Ship	State	Description
Choctaw	United States	The steel semi-whaleback ship was on a voyage from Cleveland, Ohio, to Marquette, Michigan, with a cargo of coal when the steamer Wahcondah (Canada) accidentally rammed her on her port side in Lake Huron off the coast of Michigan. Choctaw eventually rolled over, and sank in 300 feet (91 m) of water at 45.534010°N 83.509300°W.
Euphrate	France	The ocean liner was wrecked in heavy weather in the Indian Ocean off Socotra Island. All 536 passengers, 400 troops and crew were rescued, 496 by City of Nagpur (United Kingdom), 124 by Collegian (United Kingdom) and 50 by Tambora (Netherlands).
Hainton	United Kingdom	World War I: The 106-foot (32 m) trawler was stopped by SM U-25 (Imperial German Navy) and crew ordered to abandon ship. Then shelled and sunk in the North Sea 45 nautical miles (83 km) north east by east of Hornsea, Yorkshire. Her crew was picked up 12 hours later by "Earl' and "Helvitia" both (United Kingdom).
Isa Reis	Ottoman Navy	World War I: The Isa Reis-class gunboat was sunk by mines in the Bosporus. Salvaged, but not repaired until 1924 and put in service as a Customs vessel.
SMS Königsberg	Imperial German Navy	SMS Königsberg World War I: The Königsberg-class light cruiser was scuttled in the Rufiji River in German East Africa following battle damage inflicted by HMS Mersey and HMS Severn (both Royal Navy). The wreck was scrapped in 1963-1965.
Syrian	United Kingdom	World War I: The trawler was shelled and sunk in the North Sea 45 nautical miles (83 km) east north east of Hornsea by SM U-25 (Imperial German Navy). Her crew survived.
Zaffer	Ottoman Empire	The 152-foot (46 m), 332-ton, sail/steam yacht sank at Haider Pasa. Raised and scrapped after World War I.

== 12 July ==
List of shipwrecks: 12 July 1915
Ship	State	Description
Daisy	Sweden	World War I: The schooner, en route from Burntisland to Sundsvall, sank in less than one minute in the Sea of Åland after a mine explosion. Five survived, five died.
Merlin	United Kingdom	World War I: The fishing smack was scuttled in the North Sea 20 nautical miles (37 km) east south east of Lowestoft, Suffolk by SM UB-6 (Imperial German Navy). Her crew survived.
Purple Heather	United Kingdom	World War I: The fishing smack was scuttled in the North Sea 23 nautical miles (43 km) south east by east of Lowestoft by SM UB-6 (Imperial German Navy). Her crew survived.
Speedwell	United Kingdom	World War I: The fishing smack was scuttled in the North Sea 19 nautical miles (35 km) south east by east of Lowestoft by SM UB-6 (Imperial German Navy). Her crew survived.
Woodbine	United Kingdom	World War I: The fishing smack was set afire and scuttled in the North Sea 18 nautical miles (33 km) south east of Lowestoft by SM UB-6 (Imperial German Navy). Her crew survived.

== 13 July ==
List of shipwrecks: 13 July 1915
Ship	State	Description
Lennok	Russia	World War I: The cargo ship was sunk in the Atlantic Ocean 35 nautical miles (65 km) north north east of Muckle Flugga, Shetland Islands, United Kingdom by SM U-20 (Imperial German Navy). Her crew survived.

== 14 July ==
List of shipwrecks: 14 July 1915
Ship	State	Description
Rym	Norway	World War I: The cargo ship struck a mine and sank in the North Sea 1.5 nautical miles (2.8 km) off the Shipwash Lightship (United Kingdom) with the loss of a crew member.
Vivid	Belgium	World War I: The fishing vessel struck a mine and sank in the English Channel off Calais, France.

== 15 July ==
List of shipwrecks: 15 July 1915
Ship	State	Description
HMT Agamemnon II	Royal Navy	World War I: The naval trawler struck a mine and sank in the North Sea off the Shipwash Lightship (United Kingdom) with the loss of nine of her crew.
Conroy	United States	The tow steamer was struck by a strong gale of wind causing her to capsize and sink at the mouth of Mill Creek, Cincinnati, Ohio. Six crewmen died.

== 16 July ==
List of shipwrecks: 16 July 1915
Ship	State	Description
Balva	Russia	World War I: The cargo ship was sunk in the North Sea (59°45′N 4°05′E by SM U-41 (Imperial German Navy). Her crew survived.
Strathcona	United Kingdom	The auxiliary schooner was wrecked on Minerva Reefs.

== 17 July ==
List of shipwrecks: 17 July 1915
Ship	State	Description
General Radetzky	Russia	World War I: The cargo ship was sunk in the North Sea 65 nautical miles (120 km) north east of Lerwick, Shetland Islands United Kingdom (60°04′N 1°52′E) by SM U-41 (Imperial German Navy). Her crew survived.

== 18 July ==
List of shipwrecks: 18 July 1915
Ship	State	Description
Batoum	United Kingdom	World War I: The tanker was damaged in the North Sea 2.5 nautical miles (4.6 km) south by east of the Southwold Lighthouse, Suffolk, England, by the submarine SM UB-17 (Imperial German Navy) with the loss of six of her crew. She was beached but was later refloated, repaired, and returned to service.
Bertha	United States	The 926-ton steamer ran aground on a spit at the southern tip of Harvester Island (57°39′N 154°00′W) off the north coast of Kodiak Island in the Territory of Alaska. She was still aground there on 30 July when a fire completely destroyed her. Her crew of 23 survived.
Giuseppe Garibaldi	Regia Marina	World War I: The Giuseppe Garibaldi-class cruiser was torpedoed and sunk in the Adriatic Sea 5 nautical miles (9.3 km) southeast of Dubrovnik, Austria-Hungary (42°28′N 18°15′E), by the submarine SM U-4 (Austro-Hungarian Navy) with the loss of 53 of her 559 crew.

== 19 July ==
List of shipwrecks: 19 July 1915
Ship	State	Description
Capella	Sweden	World War I: The brigantine was intercepted and scuttled in the North Sea at (56°45′N 4°15′E) by SM U-6 (Imperial German Navy).
Nordlyset	Norway	World War I: The sailing vessel was sunk in the North Sea 60 nautical miles (110 km) west of Lindesnes, Lister og Mandal county, Norway (57°30′N 6°30′E) by SM U-36 (Imperial German Navy). Her crew survived.
Oklahoma	United States	The uncommissioned Nevada-class battleship was severely damaged by fire at Camden, New Jersey. She was subsequently repaired and entered service in May 1916.

== 20 July ==
List of shipwrecks: 20 July 1915
Ship	State	Description
HMY Rhiannon	Royal Navy	World War I: The naval yacht struck a mine and sank in the North Sea off the Longsand Lightship (United Kingdom) with the loss of five of her crew.
SM U-23	Imperial German Navy	World War I: The Type U 23 submarine was torpedoed and sunk in the Atlantic Ocean (58°55′N 0°14′E) by HMS C27 (Royal Navy) with the loss of 24 of her 34 crew.

== 21 July ==
List of shipwrecks: 21 July 1915
Ship	State	Description
Dorothea	Royal Navy	The motor boat was lost in the Mediterranean Sea on this date.
HMT Briton	Royal Navy	World War I: The naval trawler struck a mine and sank in the North Sea off the Longsand Lightship (United Kingdom) with the loss of eleven of her crew.
Madonna	Sweden	World War I: The barque, en route from Halmstad to West Hartlepool, was intercepted and scuttled in the North Sea by SM U-6 (Imperial German Navy).

== 22 July ==
List of shipwrecks: 22 July 1915
Ship	State	Description
Fortuna	Sweden	World War I: The sailing ship was intercepted and scuttled in the North Sea by SM U-6 (Imperial German Navy).
King Athelstan	United Kingdom	World War I: The trawler was scuttled in the Atlantic Ocean 100 nautical miles (190 km) west by north of Hoy Head, Orkney Islands (60°20′N 5°00′W) by SM U-36 (Imperial German Navy). Her crew survived.
Rubonia	Russia	World War I: The cargo ship was sunk in the Atlantic Ocean west of the Shetland Islands, United Kingdom (60°20′N 5°19′W) by SM U-36 (Imperial German Navy). Her crew survived.
Star of Peace	United Kingdom	World War I: The trawler was shelled and sunk in the Atlantic Ocean 100 nautical miles (190 km) west of Hoy, Orkney Islands by SM U-36 (Imperial German Navy). Her crew survived.

== 23 July ==
List of shipwrecks: 23 July 1915
Ship	State	Description
Agios Georgios	Greece	The cargo ship collided with Regina d'Italia (Italy) in the Mediterranean Sea off Tarifa, Andalusia, Spain. She was towed to Tangier Bay by Gibel Derba (United Kingdom and beached.
Danae	France	World War I: The cargo ship was sunk in the Atlantic Ocean 80 nautical miles (150 km) north west of Cape Wrath, Sutherland, United Kingdom by SM U-36 (Imperial German Navy).
Fimreite	Norway	World War I: The cargo ship was sunk in the Atlantic Ocean west of the Shetland Islands, United Kingdom (60°17′N 8°43′W) by SM U-36 (Imperial German Navy). Her twenty crew survived.
Hermione	United Kingdom	World War I: The trawler was shelled and sunk in the Atlantic Ocean 60 nautical miles (110 km) north by west of Hoy, Orkney Islands by SM U-36 (Imperial German Navy). Her crew were rescued by Cairnsmore (Norway).
Honoria	United Kingdom	World War I: The trawler was shelled and sunk in the Atlantic Ocean 60 nautical miles (110 km) north by west of Hoy by SM U-36 (Imperial German Navy). Her crew were rescued by Cairnsmore (Norway).
Parkwood	United Kingdom	The cargo ship ran aground in Merzen Bay. She broke in two the next day and was a total loss. Her crew survived.
Sjomanden	Norway	The cargo ship was driven ashore 20 nautical miles (37 km) west Vardø in Finnmark county, Norway. She later sank and was declared a total loss.
Sutton	United Kingdom	World War I: The trawler was shelled and sunk in the Atlantic Ocean 60 nautical miles (110 km) north by west of Hoy by SM U-36 (Imperial German Navy). Her crew were rescued by Cairnsmore (Norway).
HMT Waterlily	Royal Navy	The naval trawler collided with another vessel and sank in the English Channel off the Isle of Wight.

== 24 July ==
List of shipwrecks: 24 July 1915
Ship	State	Description
Activity	United Kingdom	World War I: The fishing smack was scuttled in the North Sea 30 nautical miles (56 km) east north east of Lowestoft, Suffolk by SM UB-12 (Imperial German Navy). Her crew survived.
Anglia	United Kingdom	World War I: The trawler was shelled and sunk in the Atlantic Ocean 25 nautical miles (46 km) north west of Sulisker by SM U-36 (Imperial German Navy). Her crew survived.
Cassio	United Kingdom	World War I: The trawler was shelled and sunk in the Atlantic Ocean 60 nautical miles (110 km) north by west of Hoy, Orkney Islands by SM U-36 (Imperial German Navy). Her crew were rescued by Cairnsmore (Norway).
Conroy	United States	The tow steamer was struck by a strong gale of wind causing her to capsize and sink at the Mouth of Mill Creek, Cincinnati, Ohio. Six crewmen died.
Eastland	United States	Eastland The passenger ship capsized and sank in 20 feet (6.1 m) of water at her dock at Cicero, Illinois due to being top heavy because of new US Government rules requiring more lifeboats. Loss of life was overall 844, 841 passengers, two crew members, and a deckhand from another ship. She was later salvaged, repaired and returned to service under various names including service in the U.S. Navy as USS Wilmette.
Grangewood	United Kingdom	World War I: The cargo ship was torpedoed and sunk in the North Sea 20 nautical miles (37 km) east north east of the Muckle Flugga Lighthouse, Shetland Islands by SM U-41 (Imperial German Navy). Her crew survived.
Henry Charles	United Kingdom	World War I: The fishing smack was scuttled in the North Sea 30 nautical miles (56 km) east north east of Lowestoft by SM UB-12 (Imperial German Navy). Her crew survived.
Kathleen	United Kingdom	World War I: The 59-ton fishing smack was scuttled in the North Sea 30 nautical miles (56 km) east north east of Lowestoft by SM UB-12 (Imperial German Navy). Her crew survived.
No. 8	Ottoman Navy	The No. 1-class motor gunboat was lost on this date.
Perseus	United Kingdom	World War I: The trawler struck a mine and sank in the North Sea 50–60 miles (80–97 km) east of Spurn with the loss of ten of her crew.
Prosper	United Kingdom	World War I: The fishing smack was scuttled in the North Sea 30 nautical miles (56 km) east north east of Lowestoft by SM UB-12 (Imperial German Navy). Her crew survived.
Roslin	United Kingdom	World War I: The trawler was shelled and sunk in the Atlantic Ocean 60 nautical miles (110 km) north by west of the Butt of Lewis, Outer Hebrides by SM U-36 (Imperial German Navy). Her crew survived.
Strathmore	United Kingdom	World War I: The trawler was shelled and sunk in the Atlantic Ocean 60 nautical miles (110 km) north by west of the Butt of Lewis by SM U-36 (Imperial German Navy). Her crew survived.
SM U-36	Imperial German Navy	World War I: The Type U 31 submarine was shelled and sunk in the Atlantic Ocean off North Rona, Outer Hebrides, United Kingdom by HMS Prince Charles (Royal Navy) with the loss of eighteen of her 34 crew. Survivors were rescued by HMS Prince Charles.

== 25 July ==
List of shipwrecks: 25 July 1915
Ship	State	Description
Celtic	United Kingdom	World War I: The trawler was shelled and sunk in the North Sea 70 nautical miles (130 km) north by west of Hoy, Orkney Islands (59°53′N 1°18′W) by SM U-41 (Imperial German Navy). Her crew survived.
Cydonia	United Kingdom	World War I: The trawler was shelled and sunk in the North Sea 70 nautical miles (130 km) north by west of Hoy (59°53′N 1°18′W) by SM U-41 (Imperial German Navy). Her crew survived.
Emblem	United Kingdom	World War I: The trawler was shelled and sunk in the North Sea 60 nautical miles (110 km) north by west of Hoy by SM U-41 (Imperial German Navy). Her crew survived.
Firth	United Kingdom	World War I: The coaster was torpedoed and sunk in the North Sea 9 nautical miles (17 km) north of the Shipwash Lightship (United Kingdom) by SM UB-6 (Imperial German Navy) with the loss of four of her crew.
Gadwall	United Kingdom	World War I: The trawler was shelled and sunk in the North Sea 70 nautical miles (130 km) north by west of Hoy (59°53′N 1°18′W) by SM U-41 (Imperial German Navy). Her crew survived.
G. P. Harbitz	Norway	World War I: The barque was intercepted, set afire and scuttled in the North Sea (56°35′N 2°33′E) by SM U-6 (Imperial German Navy). Her twelve crew were rescued by Else (Denmark).
Harboe	Norway	World War I: The schooner was set afire and sunk in the North Sea by SM U-6 (Imperial German Navy). Her nine crew were rescued by the trawler Hercules (Netherlands)
Honoria	United Kingdom	World War I: The trawler was shelled and sunk in the North Sea 100 nautical miles (190 km) west north west of North Ronaldsay, Orkney Islands by SM U-41 (Imperial German Navy). Her crew survived.
Leelanaw	United States	World War I: The cargo ship was sunk in the North Sea 60 nautical miles (110 km) north west of the Orkney Islands (59°58′N 4°50′W) by SM U-41 (Imperial German Navy). After allowing her 29-man crew to disembark, the ship was sunk and her crew taken close to shore off Orkney, where they made shore in their ship's lifeboats.
Sognedalen	Norway	World War I: The sailing ship was sunk in the North Sea (56°26′N 2°26′E) by SM U-6 (Imperial German Navy).

== 26 July ==
List of shipwrecks: 26 July 1915
Ship	State	Description
Cimba	Norway	The clipper ran aground in the Gulf of St. Lawrence and was wrecked.
Elna	Denmark	World War I: The three-masted schooner was sunk in the North Sea (56°53′N 2°46′E) by SM U-6 (Imperial German Navy).
Emma	Sweden	World War I: The coaster was sunk in the North Sea 130 nautical miles (240 km) east north east of the Longstone Lighthouse by SM U-6 (Imperial German Navy).
Marie	Denmark	World War I: The schooner was sunk in the North Sea (56°59′N 2°52′E) by SM U-6 (Imperial German Navy).
Mariotte	French Navy	World War I: The submarine was scuttled in the Dardanelles after being damaged by Ottoman shore artillery. Thirty-one crew were taken as prisoners of war.
Neptunus	Denmark	World War I: The sailing ship was sunk in the North Sea (56°59′N 2°05′E) by SM U-6 (Imperial German Navy).
SMS V188	Imperial German Navy	World War I: The V138-class destroyer was torpedoed and sunk in the North Sea by HMS E16 (Royal Navy) with the loss of five of her crew.

== 27 July ==
List of shipwrecks: 27 July 1915
Ship	State	Description
Iceni	United Kingdom	World War I: The fishing smack was scuttled in the North Sea 15 nautical miles (28 km) east of Lowestoft, Suffolk by SM UB-13 (Imperial German Navy). Her crew survived.
Salacia	United Kingdom	World War I: The fishing smack was scuttled in the North Sea 15 nautical miles (28 km) east of Lowestoft by SM UB-13 (Imperial German Navy). Her crew survived.
Westward Ho!	United Kingdom	World War I: The fishing smack was scuttled in the North Sea 25 nautical miles (46 km) south east of Lowestoft by SM UB-16 (Imperial German Navy). Her crew survived.

== 28 July ==
List of shipwrecks: 28 July 1915
Ship	State	Description
Mangara	United Kingdom	World War I: The cargo ship was torpedoed and sunk in the North Sea off Aldeburgh, Suffolk by SM UB-16 (Imperial German Navy) with the loss of eleven of her crew.
Trondhjemsfjord	Norway	World War I: The steamer was torpedoed and sunk in the Atlantic Ocean north west of the Shetland Islands, United Kingdom (61°08′N 3°27′W) by SM U-41 (Imperial German Navy). Her passengers and crew were rescued by the sailing ship Glance (flag unknown).
Young Percy	United Kingdom	World War I: The fishing smack was scuttled in the North Sea 30 nautical miles (56 km) east by north of Lowestoft, Suffolk by SM UB-13 (Imperial German Navy). Her crew survived.

== 29 July ==
List of shipwrecks: 29 July 1915
Ship	State	Description
Princesse Marie Jose	Belgium	World War I: The cargo ship was torpedoed and sunk in the English Channel 1.5 nmi (2.8 km) off the Shipwash Lightvessel (United Kingdom) by SM UB-4 (Imperial German Navy).

== 30 July ==
List of shipwrecks: 30 July 1915
Ship	State	Description
Aachen	Imperial German Navy	World War I: The minesweeper was torpedoed and sunk by the submarine HMS E1 (Royal Navy) east-northeast of Oestergarhsholme, Germany.
Achieve	United Kingdom	World War I: The fishing smack was scuttled in the North Sea 35 nautical miles (65 km) east by north of Lowestoft, Suffolk by SM UB-10 (Imperial German Navy). Her crew survived.
Athena	United Kingdom	World War I: The fishing smack was scuttled in the North Sea 35 nautical miles (65 km) east by north of Lowestoft by SM UB-10 (Imperial German Navy). Her crew survived.
Coriander	United Kingdom	World War I: The fishing smack was scuttled in the North Sea 20 nautical miles (37 km) east south east of Lowestoft by SM UB-10 (Imperial German Navy). Her crew survived.
Fitzgerald	United Kingdom	World War I: The fishing smack was scuttled in the North Sea 30 nautical miles (56 km) east south east of Lowestoft by SM UB-10 (Imperial German Navy). Her crew survived.
Iberian	United Kingdom	World War I: The cargo ship was torpedoed and sunk in the Atlantic Ocean 9 nautical miles (17 km) south west of the Fastnet Rock (51°15′N 9°36′W) by SM U-28 (Imperial German Navy) with the loss of seven crew.
Prince Albert	Belgium	World War I: The cargo ship struck a mine and sank in the North Sea 1 nautical mile (1.9 km) south west by west of the Shipwash Lightship (United Kingdom) (52°00′N 1°41′E) on 30 July.
Prospector	United Kingdom	World War I: The fishing smack was scuttled in the North Sea 28 nautical miles (52 km) east north east of Lowestoft by SM UB-10 (Imperial German Navy). Her crew survived.
Quest	United Kingdom	World War I: The fishing smack was scuttled in the North Sea 35 nautical miles (65 km) east north east of Lowestoft by SM UB-10 (Imperial German Navy). Her crew survived.
Strive	United Kingdom	World War I: The fishing smack was scuttled in the North Sea 35 nautical miles (65 km) east by north of Lowestoft by SM UB-10 (Imperial German Navy). Her crew survived.
Tors	United Kingdom	World War I: The 104-foot (32 m), 158-ton steam trawler struck two mines and sank in the North Sea 43 nautical miles (80 km) east of Spurn Point, Yorkshire with the loss of seven or eight of her crew, two survived.
Venture	United Kingdom	World War I: The fishing smack was scuttled in the North Sea 27 nautical miles (50 km) east north east of Lowestoft by SM UB-10 (Imperial German Navy). Her crew survived.

== 31 July ==
List of shipwrecks: 31 July 1915
Ship	State	Description
Arnold	United States	The 44-gross register ton, 57.5-foot (17.5 m) fishing vessel was destroyed by fire at Anchorage, Territory of Alaska.
Exeter	United States	The barge sank near Dutch Island, Rhode Island.
Galicia	United Kingdom	World War I: The passenger ship struck a mine and was damaged in English Channel 2 nautical miles (3.7 km) off the North Goodwin Lightship (United Kingdom). She was beached but was later refloated, repaired and returned to service.
Gypsum Queen	United Kingdom	The schooner was abandoned in the Atlantic Ocean (approximately 48°N 23°W). Her crew were rescued.
HMS Nugget	Royal Navy	World War I: The fleet messenger was shelled and sunk in the Atlantic Ocean 45 nautical miles (83 km) south west of the Isles of Scilly (49°05′N 6°58′W) by SM U-28 (Imperial German Navy). Her crew survived.
HMS Turquoise	Royal Navy	World War I: The fleet messenger was shelled and sunk in the Atlantic Ocean 60 nautical miles (110 km) south west of the Isles of Scilly (49°00′N 7°08′W) by SM U-28 (Imperial German Navy) with the loss of a crew member.

== Unknown date ==
List of shipwrecks: Unknown date 1915
Ship	State	Description
Bertha	Sweden	The coaster was driven ashore in Uyak Bay, Kodiak Island, Alaska, United States. She caught fire and was a total loss.
HMT Boorara	Royal Australian Navy	World War I: The troopship beached herself on Mudros after colliding with the armoured cruiser Kléber (French Navy) in the Aegean Sea. She was refloated, repaired, and returned to service.
Nogill	Denmark	World War I: The cargo ship was reported to have been sunk in the North Sea by a German submarine.
Sirra	Italy	The cargo ship was run into by P. de Satrustegui (Spain) at Buenos Aires, Argentina and was beached.
Solus	United States	The barge sank near Brentons Reef, Rhode Island.
Strathcona	United Kingdom	The schooner ran aground on the Minerva Reef, Fiji and was wrecked.
