= Pass of Balmaha =

Pass of Balmaha may refer to:

- The narrow pass at the village of Balmaha, Scotland
- Several ships with that name
