= UB10 =

UB10 may refer to:

- UB10, a postcode district in the UB postcode area
- SM UB-10, a World War I German submarine
