= List of ships named Pass of Balmaha =

A number of ships were named Pass of Balmaha, including

- Pass of Balmaha (1888 ship), a British sailing ship built in 1888 and captured in 1915, becoming the German auxiliary cruiser SMS Seeadler
- SS Pass of Balmaha (1933), a British tanker in service 1933–41
- SS Pass of Balmaha (1942), a British coastal tanker in service 1947–67
