= SM U-6 (Germany) =

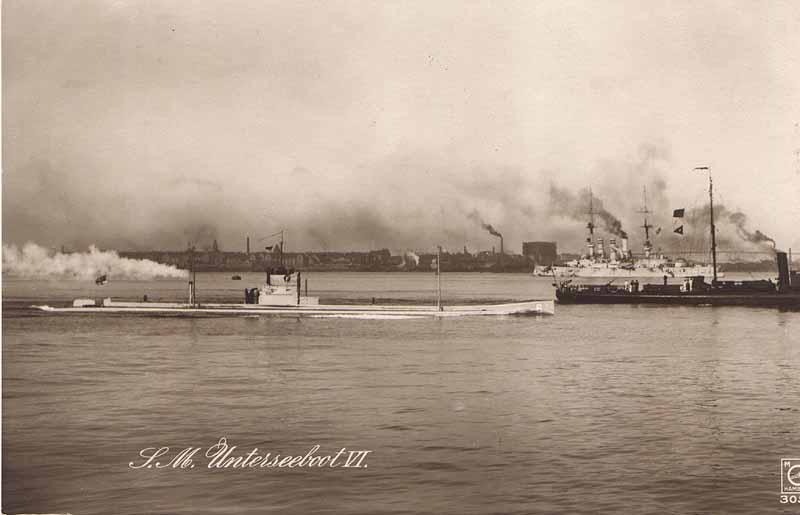

History

German Empire
- Name: U-6
- Ordered: 8 April 1908
- Builder: Germaniawerft, Kiel
- Cost: 2,540,000 Goldmark
- Yard number: 148
- Laid down: 24 August 1908
- Launched: 18 May 1910
- Commissioned: 12 August 1910
- Fate: Torpedoed and sunk 15 September 1915

General characteristics
- Class & type: Type U 5 submarine
- Displacement: 505 t (497 long tons) surfaced; 636 t (626 long tons) submerged
- Length: 57.30 m (188 ft) (o/a); 43.10 m (141 ft 5 in) (pressure hull)
- Beam: 5.60 m (18 ft 4 in) (o/a); 3.75 m (12 ft 4 in) (pressure hull)
- Draught: 3.55 m (11 ft 8 in)
- Installed power: 2 × Körting 6-cylinder and 2 × Körting 8-cylinder two stroke paraffin motors with 900 PS (660 kW; 890 shp); 2 × SSW electric motors with 1,040 PS (760 kW; 1,030 shp); 550 rpm surfaced; 600 rpm submerged
- Propulsion: 2 shafts; 2 × 1.30 m (4 ft 3 in) propellers
- Speed: 13.4 knots (24.8 km/h; 15.4 mph) surfaced; 10.2 knots (18.9 km/h; 11.7 mph) submerged
- Range: 3,300 nmi (6,100 km; 3,800 mi) at 9 knots (17 km/h; 10 mph)
- Test depth: 30 m (98 ft)
- Boats & landing craft carried: 1 dinghy
- Complement: 4 officers, 24 men
- Armament: 4 × 45 cm (17.7 in) torpedo tubes (2 each bow and stern) with 6 torpedoes; 1 × 5 cm (2.0 in) SK L/40 gun; 1 × 3.7 cm (1.5 in) Hotchkiss gun

Service record
- Part of: I. U-Halbflottille; 1 August 1914 – 15 September 1915
- Commanders: Oblt.z.S. Wilhelm-Friedrich Starke; 5 August – 28 September 1914; Oblt.z.S. Otto Steinbrinck; 29 September – 4 November 1914; Oblt.z.S. Reinhold Lepsius; 5 November 1914 – 5 January 1915; Oblt.z.S. Otto Steinbrinck; 6 January 1915 – 21 January 1915; Oblt.z.S. Reinhold Lepsius; 22 January – 15 September 1915
- Operations: 4 patrols
- Victories: 16 merchant ships sunk (9,614 GRT); 3 merchant ships taken as prize (2,337 GRT)

SM U-6 was one of 329 U-boatss which served in the Imperial German Navy during World War I. The boat was built at Germaniawerft in Kiel between 1908 and 1910, as the second Type U 5 submarine. She was launched on 18 May 1910 and commissioned into the Navy on 12 August. During the war she sank 16 merchant ships and took three as prizes with a combined loss of 11,951 Gross Register Tons. The boat was torpedoed and sunk by British submarine HMS E16 off Stavanger, Norway on 15 September 1915.

== War service ==
At the outbreak of World War I, U-6 was initially commanded by Oberleutnant zur See Wilhelm-Friedrich Starke and formed part of I U-boat Flotilla. Command passed to Oberleutnant zur See Otto Steinbrinck towards the end of 1914 before the boat was taken over by Oberleutnant zur See Reinhold Lepsius. Steinbrinck briefly took command again in January 1915, before Lepsius took over for the rest of the boat's career.

On 25 February 1915 U-6 left Germany for operations in the English Channel. She reached Cap Gris Nez on 27 February, and on 28 February was preparing to carry out an attack on the British steamer Thordis off Beachy Head, when the submarine's periscope was spotted. The merchant ship rammed U-6, damaging the boat's periscope. This forced U-6 to abandon her patrol and return to base.

U-6 operated in the North Sea between 7 and 20 April 1915. Based at Heligoland, she left for the British east coast. On 11 April she launched two torpedo attacks against a steamer off Aberdeen; both attacks failed. For the next three days U-6 observed shipping in the area until she successfully attacked and sank two steamers on 14 April. On 18 April she took the British trawler Glencarse (188 tons) as a prize and headed back to base, arriving at Heligoland on 21 April 1915.

Leaving Heligoland again on 17 July 1915, two days later U-6 sank the 422 ton Swedish sailing ship Capella which was carrying timber to Britain. On 21 July she sank two Swedish steamers and took the Norwegian steamer Anvers as a prize. Three Norwegian sailing ships were burned on 25 July and after a brief brush with a Q ship the next day, a Swedish steamer and three Danish sailing ships were burned. Running low on fuel, U-6 returned to base on 29 July, reaching Heligoland the next day.

On 9 September 1915 U-6 sailed for what would be her final patrol. She burned two Norwegian sailing ships carrying timber to Britain and on 11 September took the Norwegian steamer Randulf Hansen as a prize. She sank the three-masted auxiliary sailing ship Bien on the next day and on 13 September the Norwegian coaster Norte was searched and sunk off Kristiansand. On 14 September U-6 met with U-20.

=== Fate ===
In the afternoon on 15 September 1915, U-6 was attacked by the British submarine HMS E16 with two torpedoes. Evasive manoeuvres were only partly successful and whilst the first torpedo missed, the second struck U-6 in front of the conning tower, sinking her instantly at 59°10′N 5°9′E. Except for five men on the conning tower all of the boat's crew died. The boat's Officer of the Watch, Oberleutnant zur See Beyer, believed that the smoke from U-6's paraffin engines had made the commander of E16 aware of her presence and enabled him to manoeuvre in to firing position.

== Summary of raiding history ==
U-6 sank 16 merchant ships with a total of 9,614 GRT. She also took three ships, with a total of 2,337 GRT, as prizes under the cruiser rules. The total tonnage taken by U-6 was 11,951 GRT.

Date	Ship Name	Nationality	Tonnage (GRT)	Fate
14 April 1915	Folke	Sweden	1,352	Sunk
14 April 1915	Glencarse	United Kingdom	188	Captured as prize
14 April 1915	Vestland	Denmark	3,392	Sunk
19 July 1915	Capella	Sweden	422	Sunk
21 July 1915	Anvers	Norway	862	Captured as prize
21 July 1915	Madonna	Sweden	455	Sunk
22 July 1915	Fortuna	Sweden	203	Sunk
25 July 1915	G. P. Harbitz	Norway	673	Sunk
25 July 1915	Harboe	Norway	388	Sunk
25 July 1915	Sognedalen	Norway	644	Sunk
26 July 1915	Elna	Denmark	78	Sunk
26 July 1915	Emma	Sweden	687	Sunk
26 July 1915	Marie	Denmark	173	Sunk
26 July 1915	Neptunus	Denmark	143	Sunk
10 September 1915	Presto	Norway	206	Sunk
11 September 1915	Wansbeck	Norway	462	Sunk
11 September 1915	Randulf Hansen	Norway	1,287	Captured as prize
12 September 1915	Bien	Norway	120	Sunk
13 September 1915	Norte	Norway	216	Sunk

== Bibliography ==
- Gröner, Erich; Jung, Dieter; Maass, Martin (1991). U-boats and Mine Warfare Vessels. German Warships 1815–1945. Vol. 2. Translated by Thomas, Keith; Magowan, Rachel. London: Conway Maritime Press. ISBN 0-85177-593-4.
- Monograph No. 29: Home Waters—Part IV. From February to July 1915 (PDF). Naval Staff Monographs (Historical). Vol. XIII. The Naval Staff, Training and Staff Duties Division. 1925.
- Rössler, Eberhard (1985). Die deutschen U-Boote und ihre Werften: U-Bootbau bis Ende des 1. Weltkriegs, Konstruktionen für das Ausland und die Jahre 1935–1945 [The German Submarines and Their Shipyards: Submarine Construction Until the End of the First World War] (in German). Vol. I. Koblenz: Bernard & Graefe. ISBN 3-7637-5213-7.
- Spindler, Handelskrieg, Vol.II, pp. 75, 133-4, 246–7
