= HMS Lassoo =

Destroyer of the Royal Navy

History

United Kingdom
- Name: HMS Lassoo
- Builder: William Beardmore & Company, Dalmuir
- Launched: 24 August 1915
- Fate: Torpedoed and sunk, 13 August 1916

General characteristics
- Class & type: Laforey-class destroyer
- Displacement: 965–1,010 long tons (980–1,026 t)
- Length: 268 ft 10 in (81.94 m) o/a
- Beam: 27 ft 8 in (8.43 m)
- Draught: 10 ft 6 in (3.20 m)
- Installed power: 24,500 shp (18,300 kW); 4 × Yarrow boilers
- Propulsion: 2 Shafts; 2 steam turbines
- Speed: 29 knots (54 km/h; 33 mph)
- Range: 1,720 nmi (3,190 km; 1,980 mi) at 15 knots (28 km/h; 17 mph)
- Complement: 74
- Armament: 3 × QF 4-inch (102 mm) Mark IV guns; 2 × twin 21-inch (533 mm) torpedo tubes

HMS Lassoo was a Laforey-class destroyer built for the Royal Navy during the 1910s.

== Description ==
The Laforey class were improved and faster versions of the preceding Acasta class. They displaced 965–1,010 long tons (980–1,026 t). The ships had an overall length of 268 feet 10 inches (81.9 m), a beam of 27 feet 8 inches (8.4 m) and a draught of 10 feet 6 inches (3.2 m). Lassoo was powered by two Parsons direct-drive steam turbines, each driving one propeller shaft, using steam provided by four Yarrow boilers. The turbines developed a total of 24,500 shaft horsepower (18,300 kW) and gave a maximum speed of 29 knots (54 km/h; 33 mph). The ships carried a maximum of 280 long tons (280 t) of fuel oil that gave them a range of 1,750 nautical miles (3,240 km; 2,010 mi) at 15 knots (28 km/h; 17 mph). The ships' complement was 74 officers and ratings.

The ships were armed with three single QF 4-inch (102 mm) Mark IV guns. The ships were also fitted with two above-water twin mounts for 21-inch (533 mm) torpedoes.

== Construction and service ==
She was built during the First World War as part of an emergency program of naval construction, to an Admiralty design by William Beardmore & Company, Dalmuir. She was originally to have been named Magic but she was renamed Lassoo on 15 February 1915 before being launched on 24 August 1915. She was sunk by the German U-boat SM UB-10 on 13 August 1916 off the Maas lightship in the North Sea.

== Bibliography ==
- Colledge, J. J.; Warlow, Ben (2006) [1969]. Ships of the Royal Navy: The Complete Record of All Fighting Ships of the Royal Navy from the 15th Century to the Present (3rd Rev ed.). London: Chatham Publishing. ISBN 978-1-86176-281-8. OCLC 67375475.
- Dittmar, F.J. & Colledge, J.J. (1972). British Warships 1914–1919. Shepperton, UK: Ian Allan. ISBN 0-7110-0380-7.
- Friedman, Norman (2009). British Destroyers: From Earliest Days to the Second World War. Barnsley, UK: Seaforth Publishing. ISBN 978-1-84832-049-9.
- Gardiner, Robert & Gray, Randal (1985). Conway's All The World's Fighting Ships 1906–1921. London: Conway Maritime Press. ISBN 0-85177-245-5.
