= SM U-36 =

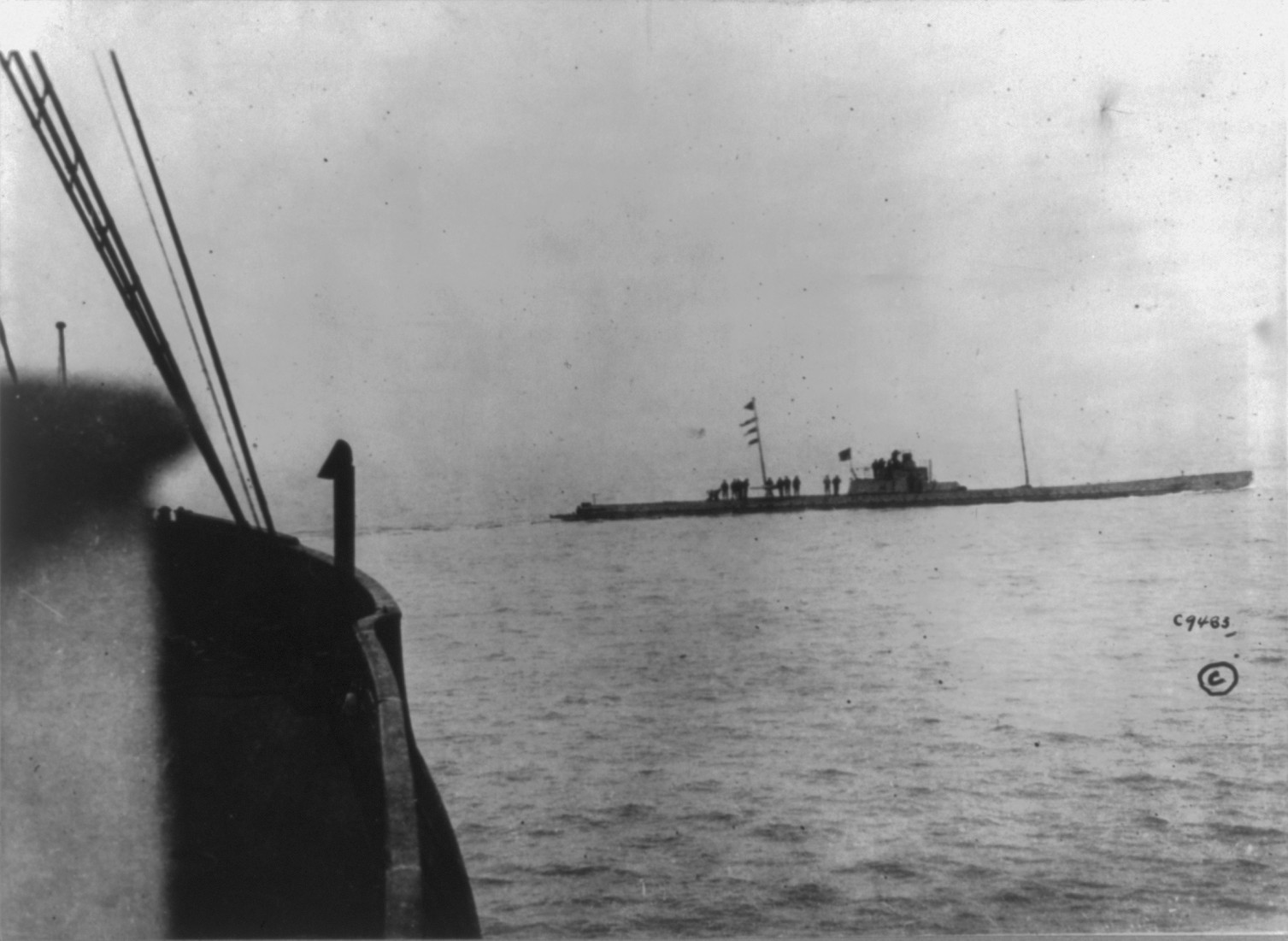
- SM U-36, photographed in April 1915 from the ship Batavia V

History

German Empire
- Name: U-36
- Ordered: 29 March 1912
- Builder: Germaniawerft, Kiel
- Yard number: 196
- Laid down: 2 January 1913
- Launched: 6 June 1914
- Commissioned: 14 November 1914
- Fate: Sunk on 24 July 1915 by the Q-ship Prince Charles

General characteristics
- Class & type: Type U 31 submarine
- Displacement: 685 t (674 long tons) (surfaced); 878 t (864 long tons) (submerged)
- Length: 64.70 m (212 ft 3 in) (o/a); 52.36 m (171 ft 9 in) (pressure hull)
- Beam: 6.32 m (20 ft 9 in) (o/a); 4.05 m (13 ft 3 in) (pressure hull)
- Draught: 3.56 m (11 ft 8 in)
- Installed power: 2 × 1,850 PS (1,361 kW; 1,825 shp) diesel engines; 2 × 1,200 PS (883 kW; 1,184 shp) Doppelmodyn
- Propulsion: 2 × shafts; 2 × 1.60 m (5 ft 3 in) propellers
- Speed: 16.4 knots (30.4 km/h; 18.9 mph) (surfaced); 9.7 knots (18.0 km/h; 11.2 mph) (submerged)
- Range: 8,790 nmi (16,280 km; 10,120 mi) at 8 knots (15 km/h; 9.2 mph) (surfaced); 80 nmi (150 km; 92 mi) at 5 knots (9.3 km/h; 5.8 mph) (submerged)
- Test depth: 50 m (164 ft 1 in)
- Boats & landing craft carried: 1 dinghy
- Complement: 4 officers, 31 enlisted
- Armament: four 50 cm (20 in) torpedo tubes (2 each bow and stern); 6 torpedoes; two 8.8 cm (3.5 in) Uk L/30 deck guns

Service record
- Part of: II Flotilla; Unknown start – 24 July 1915
- Commanders: Kptlt. Ernst Graeff; 14 November 1914 – 24 July 1915
- Operations: 2 patrols
- Victories: 14 merchant ships sunk (12,674 GRT); 3 merchant ships taken as prize (3,466 GRT)

SM U-36 (Note: "SM" stands for "Seiner Majestät" (English: His Majesty's) and combined with the U for Unterseeboot would be translated as His Majesty's Submarine.) was a Type 31 U-boat in the service of the Imperial German Navy of the German Empire, employed in the commerce war in World War I.

== Construction ==
U-36 was laid down on 2 January 1913 at Germaniawerft in Kiel. She was launched on 6 June 1914 and commissioned on 14 November 1914, under the command of Kapitänleutnant Ernst Graeff.

During February 1915, she carried out acceptance trials at Kiel, and was attached to the 2d Half-Flotilla in the North Sea in March.

== Design ==
Type U 31 submarines were double-hulled ocean-going submarines similar to Type 23 and Type 27 subs in dimensions and differed only slightly in propulsion and speed. They were considered very good high sea boats with average manoeuvrability and good surface steering.

U-36 had an overall length of 64.70 m (212 ft 3 in), her pressure hull was 52.36 m (171 ft 9 in) long. The boat's beam was 6.32 m (20 ft 9 in) (o/a), while the pressure hull measured 4.05 m (13 ft 3 in). Type 31s had a draught of 3.56 m (11 ft 8 in) with a total height of 7.68–8.04 m (25 ft 2 in – 26 ft 5 in). The boats displaced a total of 971 tonnes (956 long tons); 685 t (674 long tons) when surfaced and 878 t (864 long tons) when submerged.

U-36 was fitted with two Germania 6-cylinder two-stroke diesel engines with a total of 1,850 metric horsepower (1,361 kW; 1,825 bhp) for use on the surface and two Siemens-Schuckert double-acting electric motors with a total of 1,200 PS (883 kW; 1,184 shp) for underwater use. These engines powered two shafts each with a 1.60 m (5 ft 3 in) propeller, which gave the boat a top surface speed of 16.4 knots (30.4 km/h; 18.9 mph), and 9.7 knots (18.0 km/h; 11.2 mph) when submerged. Cruising range was 8,790 nautical miles (16,280 km; 10,120 mi) at 8 knots (15 km/h; 9.2 mph) on the surface, and 80 nmi (150 km; 92 mi) at 5 knots (9.3 km/h; 5.8 mph) under water. Diving depth was 50 m (164 ft 1 in).

The U-boat was armed with four 50 cm (20 in) torpedo tubes, two fitted in the bow and two in the stern, and carried 6 torpedoes. Additionally U-36 was equipped in 1915 with two 8.8 cm (3.5 in) Uk L/30 deck guns. The boat's complement was 4 officers and 31 enlisted.

== Service history ==
SM U-36's movements and operations were monitored and reported by British Naval Intelligence, better known as "Room 40". Her first war patrol was in Heligoland Bight from 29 to 30 March 1915; she reported no sinkings during this time. On 23 April, she returned to Heligoland Bight, apparently from a North Sea patrol. (Note: The British called them "cruises".)

She departed on 29 April, bound again for the North Sea, where she sank the 1,966-ton Danish steamer Lilian Drost on 8 May, captured the 1,241-ton Swedish steamer Björn on 10 May as a prize, while capturing and releasing the 654-ton Dutch steamer Niobe the same day.

U-36 returned to her North Sea station on 17 July. Operating off the north and northwest coast of Scotland, she sank three steamers and almost a dozen smaller vessels. On 22 July, the 3,644-ton Russian Rubonia fell victim. That same day, U-36 also attacked a group of fishing vessels west of the Orkney Islands, sinking nine small trawlers and two sailing vessels, while taking one prize. The following day, the 1,505-ton Frenchman Danae was stopped according to prize rules and sunk, and the 3,819-ton Norwegian Fimreite was sunk as well.

On the day she was sunk, U-36 intercepted and captured the American windjammer Pass of Balmaha, bearing a cargo of cotton intended for Russia and en route to Kirkwall to be inspected by British authorities. An ensign from U-36 was left aboard the windjammer to ensure her successful passage to Cuxhaven. Pass was refitted as a merchant raider and re-christened Seeadler, commanded by Count Felix von Luckner, soon to become famous for her naval exploits in the Atlantic and Pacific.

=== Fate ===
U-36 was sunk in the afternoon of 24 July 1915 in combat off the coast of North Rona in the Outer Hebrides with the British Q-ship (Note: She is described as an "armed collier" in the original document.) Prince Charles, commanded by Lieutenant Mark Wardlaw, Royal Navy. The submarine had just stopped and boarded the Danish vessel SS Luise and a boarding party was in the process of dumping her cargo when a lookout sighted an approaching steamer. U-36 sailed towards the disguised Prince Charles and ordered her to stop while firing at her. The Q-ship complied, swinging out her boats. The unsuspecting submarine came within about 600 m (660 yd) of the ship when Prince Charles hoisted the British flag of war and commenced firing. Taken completely by surprise, U-36 took several direct hits and heavy damage, and sank. When Luise moved to pick up the survivors floating in the water, Prince Charles fired into her, believing her to be a German resupply vessel. Forty-five minutes after U-36 sank, the remaining survivors were picked up by the Q-ship. Kptlt. Graeff and 15 crewmen were saved, but 18 others were lost. U-36 was the first U-boat sunk by Q-ship, and one of only a handful to fall victim. Lieutenant Wardlaw received a Distinguished Service Order for the action, and two of his crew received Distinguished Service Medals. The merchant crew of the Q-ship was awarded a prize sum of £1,000, to be divided amongst themselves.

== Summary of raiding history ==
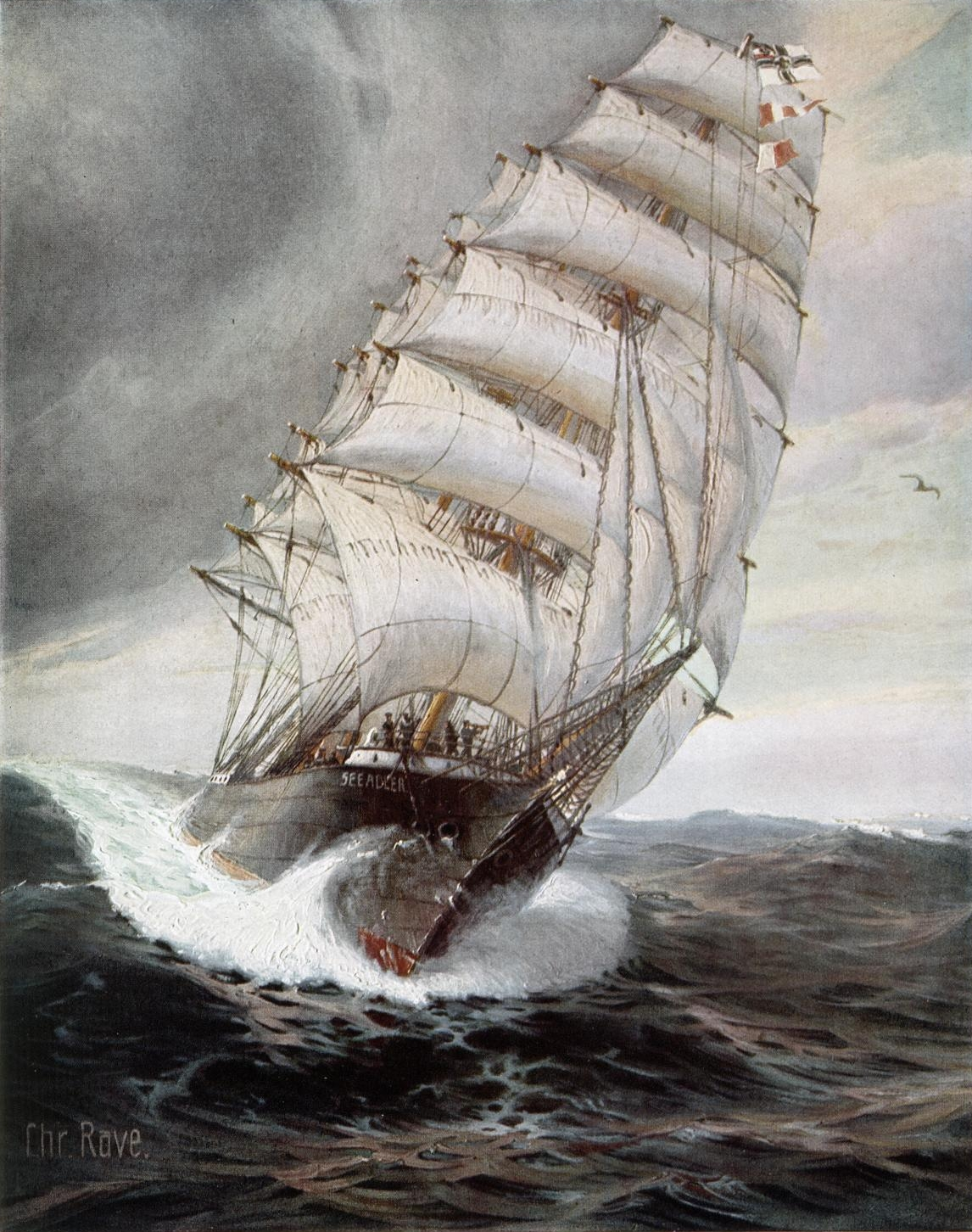
Artist's rendition of the captured American windjammer Pass of Balmaha reoutfitted as the merchant raider SMS Seeadler

Date	Name	Nationality	Tonnage (Note: Tonnages are in gross register tons)	Fate
8 May 1915	Lilian Drost	Denmark	1,966	Sunk
10 May 1915	Björn	Sweden	1,241	Captured as prize
10 May 1915	Niobe	Netherlands	654	Captured as prize
19 July 1915	Nordlyset	Norway	82	Sunk
22 July 1915	King Athelstan	United Kingdom	159	Sunk
22 July 1915	Rubonia	Russian Empire	3,644	Sunk
22 July 1915	Star Of Peace	United Kingdom	180	Sunk
23 July 1915	Danae	France	1,505	Sunk
23 July 1915	Fimreite	Norway	3,819	Sunk
23 July 1915	Hermione	United Kingdom	210	Sunk
23 July 1915	Honoria	United Kingdom	207	Sunk
23 July 1915	Sutton	United Kingdom	332	Sunk
24 July 1915	Anglia	United Kingdom	107	Sunk
24 July 1915	Cassio	United Kingdom	172	Sunk
24 July 1915	Pass Of Balmaha	United States	1,571	Captured as a prize
24 July 1915	Roslin	United Kingdom	128	Sunk
24 July 1915	Strathmore	United Kingdom	163	Sunk

== See also ==
- Room 40

== Bibliography ==
- Beesly, Patrick (1982). Room 40: British Naval Intelligence 1914–1918. London: H Hamilton. ISBN 978-0-241-10864-2.
- Fitzsimons, Bernard, ed. The Illustrated Encyclopedia of 20th Century Weapons and Warfare, "U-Boats (1905–18), Volume 23, p. 2534. London: Phoebus Publishing, 1978.
- Gröner, Erich; Jung, Dieter; Maass, Martin (1991). U-boats and Mine Warfare Vessels. German Warships 1815–1945. Vol. 2. Translated by Thomas, Keith; Magowan, Rachel. London: Conway Maritime Press. ISBN 0-85177-593-4.*Halpern, Paul G. (1995). A Naval History of World War I. New York: Routledge. ISBN 978-1-85728-498-0.
- Bodo Herzog: Deutsche U-Boote 1906-1966. Manfred Pawlak Verlags GmbH, Herrschingen 1990, ISBN 3-88199-687-7
- Paul Kemp: Die deutschen und österreichischen U-Boot Verluste in beiden Weltkriegen. Urbes Verlag Hans Jürgen Hansen, Gräfelfing vor München 1998, ISBN 3-924896-43-7
- Koerver, Hans Joachim (2008). Room 40: German Naval Warfare 1914–1918. Vol I., The Fleet in Action. Steinbach: LIS Reinisch. ISBN 978-3-902433-76-3.
- Koerver, Hans Joachim (2009). Room 40: German Naval Warfare 1914–1918. Vol II., The Fleet in Being. Steinbach: LIS Reinisch. ISBN 978-3-902433-77-0.
- Roessler, Eberhard (1997). Die Unterseeboote der Kaiserlichen Marine. Bonn: Bernard & Graefe. ISBN 978-3-7637-5963-7.
- Schroeder, Joachim (2002). Die U-Boote des Kaisers. Bonn: Bernard & Graefe. ISBN 978-3-7637-6235-4.
- Spindler, Arno (1966) [1932]. Der Handelskrieg mit U-Booten. 5 Vols. Berlin: Mittler & Sohn. Vols. 4+5, dealing with 1917+18, are very hard to find: Guildhall Library, London, has them all, also Vol. 1-3 in an English translation: The submarine war against commerce.
- von Mantey, Eberhard (1933). Der Krieg zur See – Der Handelskrieg mit U-Booten. Band 2 (Februar bis September 1915). Berlin: E. S. Mittler & Sohn. p. 83–84. („U 36”, Kaptlt. Graeff, am 29. 4.–12. 5.)
- von Mantey, Eberhard (1933). Der Krieg zur See – Der Handelskrieg mit U-Booten. Band 2 (Februar bis September 1915). Berlin: E. S. Mittler & Sohn. p. 118–120. (Der Verlust von „U 36”, Kaptlt. Graeff, am 24. 7. 15.; List of lost crewmembers p. 296.)
