= Prince Charles (Q-ship) =

History

United Kingdom
- Name: HMS Prince Charles
- Builder: Mackay Bros., Alloa
- Launched: 18 May 1905

General characteristics
- Type: Q-ship
- Tonnage: 370, or 373 GRT
- Displacement: 270 long tons (274 t)
- Length: 135 ft 0 in (41.1 m)
- Beam: 25 ft 6 in (7.8 m)
- Draught: 11 ft 7 in (3.5 m)
- Complement: 10 merchant mariners + 11 naval personnel
- Armament: 1 × 6-pounder (57 mm) + 1 × 3-pounder (47 mm) guns

HMS Prince Charles was a 274 gross register tonnage collier converted to a Q-Ship of the Royal Navy during the First World War. In the afternoon of 24 July 1915 off North Rona in the Outer Hebrides, Prince Charles, commanded by Lieutenant William Penrose Mark-Wardlaw, sank the German submarine SM U-36. The sinking was the first by a Q-Ship working alone without the assistance of a British submarine.

U-36 was a type 31 submarine commissioned on 6 June 1914 under the command of Captain E. Graeff. By July 1915 she had sunk 14 merchant ships and taken three more as prizes. On the day she was sunk, U-36 had just stopped and boarded the Danish vessel SS Luise. The boarding party was in the process of dumping her cargo when a lookout sighted an approaching steamer. U-36 sailed towards the disguised Prince Charles, fired at her, and ordered her to stop. Prince Charles complied, swinging out her boats. The unsuspecting submarine came within about 600 m of Prince Charles when Prince Charles hoisted her naval ensign and commenced firing. Prince Charles scored a hit on the conning tower of U-36. She dived but then quickly resurfaced. By this time Prince Charles was only 300 m away and was able to achieve more hits. U-36 surrendered, but having sustained heavy damage, sank, taking 18 crew members with her. Fifteen crew members, including Commander Graeff, survived.

Lieutenant Mark-Wardlaw received a Distinguished Service Order for the action, and two of his crew received Distinguished Service Medals. The merchant crew of the Q-ship (Master: Frank Norman Moncrieffe Maxwell) was awarded a prize sum of £1,000, to be divided amongst themselves.

The Navy later withdrew Prince Charles from service as a Q-ship because she was small, slow, and relatively unseaworthy. She returned to merchant service after the war, sailing for various owners and under various names. She capsized and sank on 10 December 1944.
