= SM UB-10 =

German Type UB I-class submarine

- UB-10 was identical in design to UB-15 (shown here in service as the Austro-Hungarian U-11)

History

German Empire
- Name: UB-10
- Ordered: 15 October 1914
- Builder: AG Weser, Bremen
- Yard number: 219
- Laid down: 7 November 1914
- Launched: 20 February 1915
- Commissioned: 15 March 1915
- Decommissioned: 12 September 1918
- Fate: Scuttled off Flanders on 5 October 1918

General characteristics
- Class & type: Type UB I submarine
- Displacement: 127 t (125 long tons), surfaced; 141 t (139 long tons), submerged
- Length: 27.88 m (91 ft 6 in) (o/a)
- Beam: 3.15 m (10 ft 4 in)
- Draft: 3.03 m (9 ft 11 in)
- Propulsion: 1 × propeller shaft; 1 × Körting 4-cylinder diesel engine, 60 PS (44 kW); 1 × Siemens-Schuckert electric motor, 120 PS (88 kW)
- Speed: 7.45 knots (13.80 km/h; 8.57 mph), surfaced; 6.24 knots (11.56 km/h; 7.18 mph), submerged
- Range: 1,500 nmi (2,800 km; 1,700 mi) at 5 knots (9.3 km/h; 5.8 mph) surfaced; 45 nmi (83 km; 52 mi) at 4 knots (7.4 km/h; 4.6 mph) submerged
- Test depth: 50 metres (160 ft)
- Complement: 14
- Armament: 2 × 45 cm (17.7 in) bow torpedo tubes; 2 × torpedoes; 1 × 8 mm (0.31 in) machine gun
- Notes: 33-second diving time

Service record
- Part of: Flanders Flotilla; 27 March 1915 – 5 October 1918
- Commanders: Oblt. Otto Steinbrinck; 13 March 1915 – 12 January 1916; Oblt. Reinhold Saltzwedel; 13 January – 18 June 1916; Oblt. Gustav Buch; 19 June – 11 September 1916; Oblt. Wilhelm Amberger; 12 September – 13 November 1916; Oblt. Erich von Rohrscheidt; 14 November 1916 – 7 January 1917; Oblt. Ulrich Pilzecker; 8 January – 12 February 1917; Oblt. Matthias Graf von Schmettow; 13 February – 2 March 1917; Oblt. Erich von Rohrscheidt; 3 March – 31 May 1917; Oblt. Georg Reimarus; 1 June – 6 July 1917; Oblt. Fritz Gregor; 7 July – 7 September 1917; Oblt. Helmut Lorenz; 8 September – 16 October 1917; Oblt. Erich Stephan; 17–27 October 1917; Oblt. Freiherr Cassius von Montigny; 28 October – 7 November 1917; Oblt. Erich Stephan; 8 November 1917 – 29 January 1918; Oblt. Fritz von Twardowski; 30 January – 27 February 1918; Oblt. Hans Joachim Emsmann; 28 February – 17 May 1918; Oblt. Willy Stüben; 18 May – 5 October 1918
- Operations: 115 patrols
- Victories: 36 merchant ships sunk (22,604 GRT); 1 warship sunk (1,010 tons)

SM UB-10 was a German Type UB I submarine or U-boat in the German Imperial Navy (German: Kaiserliche Marine) during World War I.

UB-10 was ordered in October 1914 and was laid down at the AG Weser shipyard in Bremen in November. UB-10 was a little under 28 metres (92 ft) in length and displaced between 127 and 141 t (125 and 139 long tons), depending on whether surfaced or submerged. She carried two torpedoes for her two bow torpedo tubes and was also armed with a deck-mounted machine gun. UB-10 was broken into sections and shipped by rail to Antwerp for reassembly. She was launched in February 1915 and commissioned as SM UB-10 in March. (Note: "SM" stands for "Seiner Majestät" (English: His Majesty's) and combined with the U for Unterseeboot would be translated as His Majesty's Submarine.) The U-boat was the first of her class to commence operations when she entered service on 27 March 1915.

UB-10 was the first boat assigned to the Flanders Flotilla, the unit in which she spent her entire career. Her first two commanders were Otto Steinbrinck and Reinhold Saltzwedel, fifth and eleventh, respectively, among the top-scoring German submarine commanders of the war. UB-10 was credited with sinking 37 ships, about two-thirds of them British fishing vessels. The first ship sunk, the neutral Dutch steamer Katwijk, provoked outrage in the Netherlands and helped turn Dutch public opinion against Germany. That sinking was also the impetus behind a renewed effort to avoid attacking neutral ships by U-boats. In a 13-day span in July and August 1915, UB-10 sank 23 ships, and by herself accounted for nearly all of the tonnage sunk by the Flanders Flotilla in the latter month. She was also responsible for sinking the British destroyer HMS Lassoo in August 1916. UB-10 had two close calls with British submarines near the Schouwen Bank off Zeebrugge in 1916 and 1917, but survived both.

By 1918, UB-10 had been converted into a minelayer by the replacement of her torpedo tubes with four mine chutes. UB-10 was seriously damaged in a British air raid on Flanders in July 1918, and was decommissioned in September 1918 in a worn out condition. She was not deemed seaworthy to sail to Germany when the bases in Flanders were being evacuated by the Germans in October 1918 and was scuttled off Zeebrugge in early October.

== Design and construction ==
After the German Army's rapid advance along the North Sea coast in the earliest stages of World War I, the German Imperial Navy found itself without suitable submarines that could be operated in the narrow and shallow seas off Flanders. Project 34, a design effort begun in mid-August 1914, produced the Type UB I design: a small submarine that could be shipped by rail to a port of operations and quickly assembled. Constrained by railroad size limitations, the UB I design called for a boat about 28 metres (92 ft) long and displacing about 125 t (123 long tons) with two torpedo tubes. (Note: A further refinement of the design—replacing the torpedo tubes with mine chutes but changing little else—evolved into the Type UC I coastal minelaying submarine. See: Miller, p. 458.)

UB-10 was part of the initial allotment of seven submarines—numbered UB-9 to UB-15—ordered on 15 October from AG Weser of Bremen, just shy of two months after planning for the class began. UB-10 was laid down by Weser in Bremen on 7 November. As built, UB-10 was 27.88 metres (91 ft 6 in) long, 3.15 metres (10 ft 4 in) abeam, and had a draft of 3.03 metres (9 ft 11 in). She had a single 60-metric-horsepower (44 kW) Körting 4-cylinder diesel engine for surface travel, and a single 120-metric-horsepower (88 kW) Siemens-Schuckert double-acting electric motor for underwater travel, both attached to a single propeller shaft. Her top speeds were 7.45 knots (13.80 km/h; 8.57 mph), surfaced, and 6.24 knots (11.56 km/h; 7.18 mph), submerged. At more moderate speeds, she could sail up to 1,500 nautical miles (2,800 km; 1,700 mi) on the surface before refueling, and up to 45 nautical miles (83 km; 52 mi) submerged before recharging her batteries. Like all boats of the class, UB-10 was rated to a diving depth of 50 meters (160 ft), and could completely submerge in 33 seconds.

UB-10 was armed with two 45-centimeter (17.7 in) torpedoes in two bow torpedo tubes. She was also outfitted for a single 8-millimeter (0.31 in) machine gun on deck. UB-10's standard complement consisted of one officer and thirteen enlisted men.

After work on UB-10 was complete at the Weser yard, she was readied for rail shipment. The process of shipping a UB I boat involved breaking the submarine down into what was essentially a knock down kit. Each boat was broken into approximately fifteen pieces and loaded onto eight railway flatcars. In early 1915, the sections of UB-10 were shipped to Antwerp for assembly in what was typically a two- to three-week process. After UB-10 was assembled and launched on 20 February, she was loaded on a barge and taken through canals to Bruges where she underwent trials.

== Early career ==
The submarine was commissioned into the German Imperial Navy as SM UB-10 on 15 March 1915 under the command of Oberleutnant zur See (Oblt.z.S.) Otto Steinbrinck the 26-year-old former skipper of U-6. (Note: Steinbrinck was in the Navy's April 1907 cadet class with 34 other future U-boat captains, including Werner Fürbringer, Heino von Heimburg, Hans Howaldt, and Ralph Wenninger. See: Helgason, Guðmundur. "WWI Officer Crews: Crew 4/07". German and Austrian U-boats of World War I - Kaiserliche Marine - Uboat.net.) On 27 March, UB-10 became the first UB I boat to begin operations, and the first U-boat attached to the Flanders Flotilla (German: U-boote des Marinekorps U-Flotille Flandern) when it was organized on 29 March. When UB-10 began operations, Germany was in the midst of its first submarine offensive, begun in February. During this campaign, enemy vessels in the German-defined war zone (German: Kriegsgebiet), which encompassed all waters around the United Kingdom, were to be sunk. Vessels of neutral countries were not to be attacked unless they definitively could be identified as enemy vessels operating under a false flag.

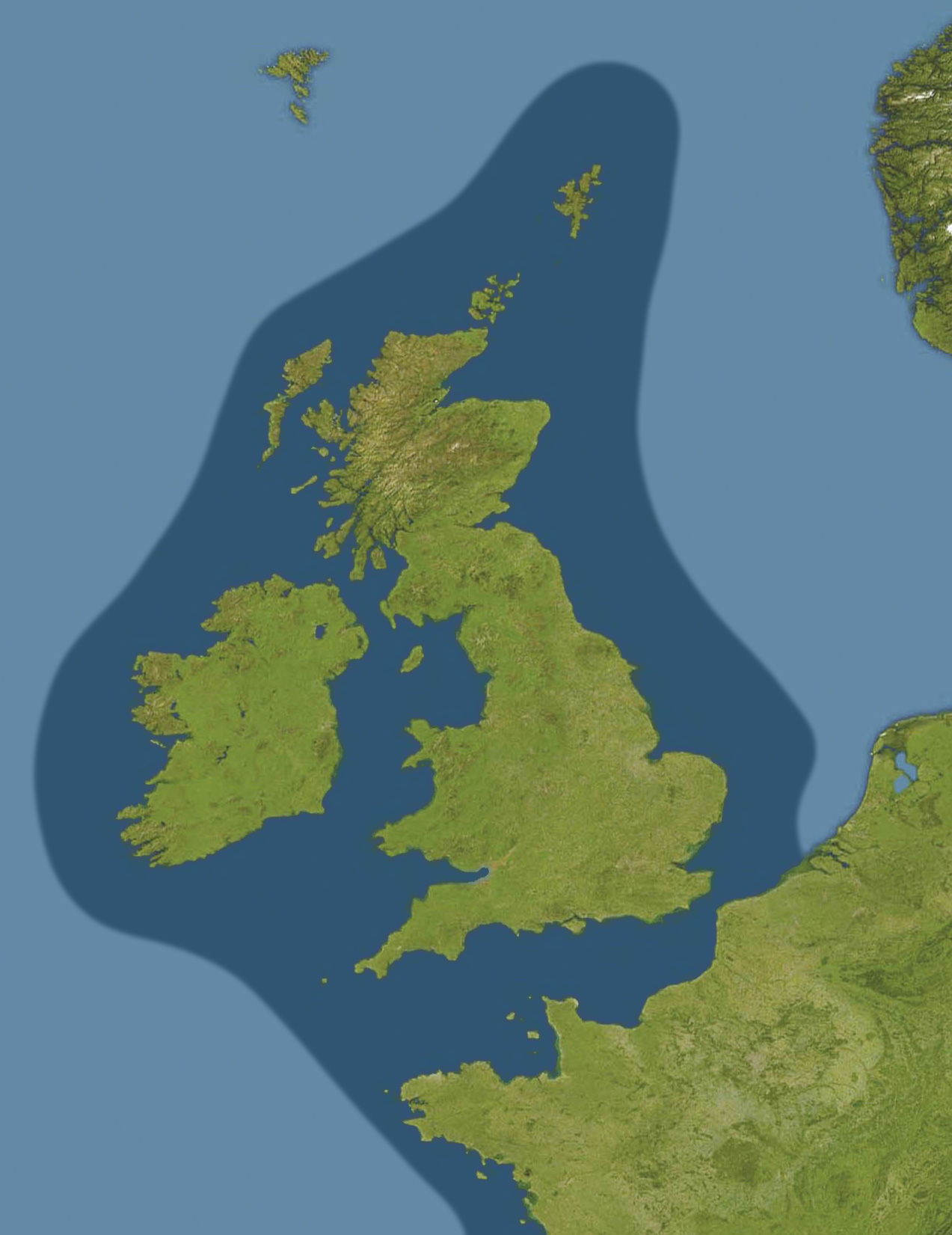
The German war zone (German: Kriegsgebiet) for the first submarine offensive.

The UB I boats of the Flanders Flotilla were initially limited to patrols in the Hoofden, the southern portion of the North Sea between the United Kingdom and the Netherlands. UB-4 made the first sortie of the flotilla on 9 April, and UB-10 departed on her first patrol soon after. On 14 April, Steinbrinck and UB-10 sank their first ship, the 2,040-ton Dutch steamer Katwijk, 6 nautical miles (11 km; 6.9 mi) west of the North Hinder Lightship. Although no one was killed in the attack, the attack on a neutral ship sailing between neutral ports—Katwijk was sailing from Rotterdam to Baltimore—provoked outrage among the Dutch population. The sinking of Katwijk and other Dutch ships sharply turned public opinion in the Netherlands against Germany. As a direct result of UB-10's sinking of Katwijk, and to avoid further provoking the Dutch or other neutrals (primarily the United States), the German government issued an order on 18 April that no neutral vessels were to be attacked. The German government later paid compensation for the sinking of Katwijk.

It was early June before UB-10 sank her next ship. The Belgian ship Menapier, carrying a load of iron ore from Algiers for Middlesbrough, was torpedoed and sunk off North Foreland by Steinbrinck on the 7th. Of the 23 persons on board the 1,886-ton ship, only 6 were saved. Menapier's master, his wife, and six-year-old daughter, the first mate, the pilot, and 12 other crewmen perished.

After UB-10's sister boat UB-6 pioneered a route through British anti-submarine nets and mines in the Straits of Dover on 21 and 22 June, boats of the flotilla began to patrol into the English Channel. UB-2, UB-5, and UB-10 soon followed with patrols in the Channel, but were hampered by fog and bad weather. Even though none of the boats sank any ships, by successfully completing their voyages, they helped further prove the feasibility of defeating the British countermeasures in the Straits of Dover.

On 30 June, Steinbrinck and the crew of UB-10, which was back patrolling in the North Sea, had a busy day when they sank eight British fishing vessels ranging from 43 gross register tons (GRT) while patrolling between 20 and 35 nautical miles (37 and 65 km; 23 and 40 mi) east of Lowestoft. All eight of the sunken ships were smacks—sailing vessels traditionally rigged with red ochre sails—which were stopped, boarded by crewmen from UB-10, and sunk with explosives.

=== August 1915 ===
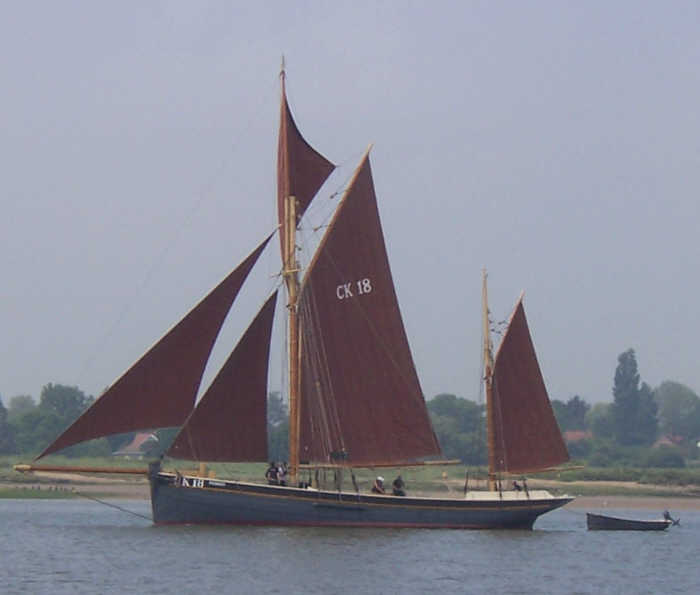
The majority of UB-10's victims were fishing smacks, traditionally outfitted with red ochre sails, like this contemporary smack.

UB-10 began August 1915 by capturing and burning Alert—another British fishing smack—off Lowestoft on the 1st. The same day, Fulgens, a 2,512-ton collier, was torpedoed one nautical mile (1.8 km) from Palling; the crew of the ship—UB-10's largest victim to-date—were all saved.

On 8 August, UB-10 captured and sank two more smacks—Arbor Vitae and Xmas Rose—off Lowestoft, and followed that up by sinking the largest ship of her career two days later. The 4,243 GRT Rosalie, headed from North Shields for San Francisco, was torpedoed 3 nautical miles (5.6 km; 3.5 mi) from the Blankeney Buoy. A contemporary news account reported that Rosalie had been beached, but was apparently irreparably damaged; all her crew, however, was saved.

On 11 August, one day after sinking Rosalie, Steinbrinck and the crew of UB-10 bettered their 30 June activities by sinking ten fishing smacks off Cromer. All ten ships, which ranged in size from 41 to 62 tons, were boarded and sunk by explosives. With these ten ships, the August tally for Steinbrinck and UB-10 was 7,309 tons, which accounted for nearly all of the 7,709 tons sunk by Flanders Flotilla boats that month. In addition, counting the ships sunk at the end of July, UB-10 sank 23 ships in a 13-day span, nearly half the 55 ships sunk by the flotilla in both July and August.

=== End of the first submarine offensive ===
On 18 August, the chief of the Admiralstab, Admiral Henning von Holtzendorff, issued orders suspending the first offensive. The suspension was in response to American demands after German submarines had sunk the Cunard Line steamer Lusitania in May 1915, along with other high-profile sinkings in August and September. Holtzendorff's directive ordered all U-boats out of the English Channel and the South-Western Approaches and required that all submarine activity in the North Sea be conducted strictly along prize regulations. UB-10 did not sink another ship for the next four months.

On 20 December, UB-10 sank the last two ships under Steinbrinck's command. The 512-ton Belford and the 1,153-ton Huntly were both torpedoed off Boulogne; there were no casualties on Belford, but two men on Huntly died in the attack. The Huntly was the former German hospital ship Ophelia, which had been seized by English naval forces and renamed the previous year.

On 13 January 1916, Steinbrinck was succeeded by Oblt.z.S. Reinhold Saltzwedel in command of UB-10. Steinbrinck, who went on to command three more U-boats during the war—UB-18, UC-65, and UB-57—continued the successes he had in command of UB-10. He was fifth among the top-scoring German submarine commanders of the war, with a tally of 210,000 tons of shipping to his credit. Saltzwedel, Steinbrinck's 26-year-old replacement, was an eight-year veteran of the Kaiserliche Marine and a first-time U-boat commander.

== Second submarine offensive ==
By early 1916, the British blockade of Germany was beginning to have an effect on Germany and her imports. The Royal Navy had stopped and seized more cargo destined for Germany than the quantity of cargo sunk by German U-boats in the first submarine offensive. As a result, the German Imperial Navy began a second offensive against merchant shipping on 29 February. The final ground rules agreed upon by the German Admiralstab were that all enemy vessels in Germany's self-proclaimed war zone would be destroyed without warning, that enemy vessels outside the war zone would be destroyed only if armed, and—to avoid antagonizing the United States—that enemy passenger steamers were not to be attacked, regardless of whether in the war zone or not.

UB-10's first victim in the new offensive (and Saltzwedel's first as a commander), came on 19 March when the U-boat torpedoed Port Dalhousie, a 1,744-ton Canadian steamer, 2 nautical miles (3.7 km; 2.3 mi) from the Kentish Knock Lightvessel. Nineteen men on the ship—headed from Middlesbrough to Nantes with a cargo of steel billets—were lost in the attack; the mate, a pilot, and five crewmen were rescued. About two weeks later, UB-10 torpedoed and sank the Norwegian steamer Peter Hanre in nearly the same location; fourteen men on the 1,081-ton cargo ship were lost. Near the end of April 1916, Admiral Reinhardt Scheer, the newest commander-in-chief of the High Seas Fleet, called off the merchant shipping offensive and ordered all boats at sea to return, and all boats in port to remain there. Port Dalhousie and Peter Hanre were the only ships sunk by UB-10 during the six-week offensive.

== Grand Fleet ambush attempts ==
In mid-May, Scheer completed plans to draw out part of the British Grand Fleet. The German High Seas Fleet would sortie for a raid on Sunderland, luring the British fleet across "'nests' of submarines and mine-fields". In support of the operation, UB-10 and five other Flanders boats set out at midnight 30/31 May to form a line 18 nautical miles (33 km; 21 mi) east of Lowestoft. (Note: The other five boats for the May action were UB-6, UB-12, UB-16, UB-17, and UB-29.) This group was to intercept and attack the British light forces from Harwich, should they sortie north to join the battle. Unfortunately for the Germans, the British Admiralty had intelligence reports of the departure of the submarines which, coupled with an absence of attacks on shipping, aroused British suspicions.

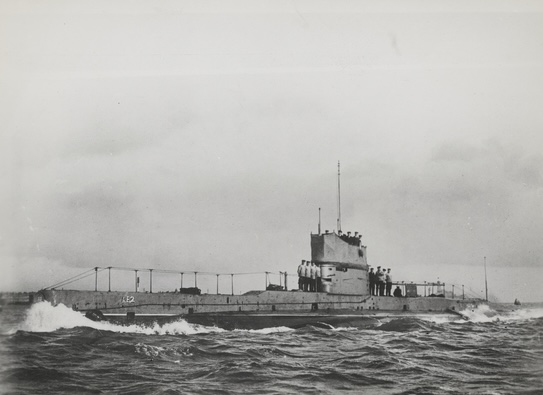
UC-10 was sunk by E54 (similar in appearance to AE2, pictured) after UB-10 avoided detection by the British submarine on 21 August 1915.

A delayed departure of the German High Seas Fleet for its sortie (which had been redirected to the Skagerrak) and the failure of several of the U-boats stationed to the north to receive the coded message warning of the British advance caused Scheer's anticipated ambush to be a "complete and disappointing failure". UB-10 sighted the Harwich forces, but they were too far away to mount an attack. The failure of the submarine ambush to sink any British capital ships allowed the full Grand Fleet to engage the numerically inferior High Seas Fleet in the Battle of Jutland, which took place 31 May – 1 June.

In mid-June, Saltzwedel was transferred to UC-10, and—as was the case with Steinbrinck—went on become one of the top-scoring U-boat commanders of the war, placing eleventh on the list with 150,000 tons to his credit. After Saltzwedel, UB-10 was assigned a new commander about every two to three months through the end of the war. Saltzwedel's immediate replacement on UB-10 was Kapitänleutnant (Kptlt.) Gustav Buch, who led the boat in sinking her only warship, the British destroyer Lassoo on 13 August; Lassoo was torpedoed off the Maas Lightvessel and sank with the loss of six men. Later in August, UB-10 was fortunate enough to avoid attack by a British submarine when departing Zeebrugge. On the morning of 21 August, the outbound UB-10 had a rendezvous with the homeward-bound UC-10 off the North Hinder Lightship and exchanged information. (Note: UB-10's former commander Saltzwedel had been transferred from UC-10 to UC-11 about a week before. See: Helgason, Guðmundur. "WWI U-boat commanders: Oblt. Reinhold Saltzwedel". German and Austrian U-boats of World War I - Kaiserliche Marine - Uboat.net.) UC-10 parted company with UB-10 at about 13:30 and resumed her course for Zeebrugge, but was torpedoed and sunk by HMS E54, which had been lurking about the Schouwen Bank off Zeebrugge.

== Unrestricted submarine warfare ==
Since the early stages of the war, the Royal Navy had blockaded Germany, preventing neutral shipping from reaching German ports. By the time of the so-called "turnip winter" of 1916–17, the blockade had severely limited imports of food and fuel into Germany. Among the results were an increase in infant mortality and as many as 700,000 deaths attributed to starvation or hypothermia during the war. With the blockade having such dire consequences, Kaiser Wilhelm II personally approved a resumption of unrestricted submarine warfare to begin on 1 February 1917 to help force the British to make peace. The new rules of engagement specified that no ship was to be left afloat.

Under these new rules of engagement, UB-10, now under the command of Kptlt. Erich von Rohrscheidt, first sank the Dutch steamer Amstelstromm on 27 March. When encountered by UB-10, Amstelstromm was found "derelict and badly damaged" after shelling by German destroyers V44, G86, and G87; von Rohrscheidt launched a coup de grâce at the stricken ship and sent it down 20 nautical miles (37 km; 23 mi) east-northeast of the North Hinder Lightvessel.

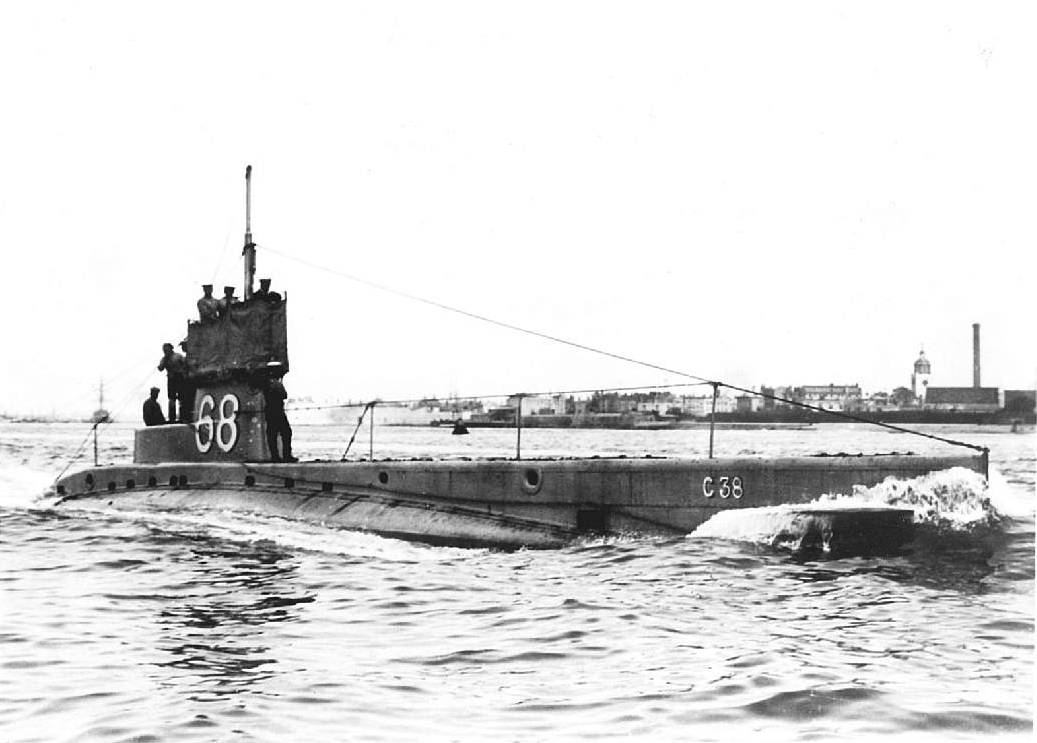
HMS C7 (similar to C38, pictured) launched a torpedo at UB-10 in April 1917, but the weapon's premature explosion allowed the German U-boat to escape.

As UB-10 was returning to Zeebrugge in early April, she was attacked by a British submarine near the area where she had escaped from HMS E54 the previous August. HMS C7, which had been waiting off the Schouwen gas buoy, launched a torpedo at a U-boat at 03:30 on 5 April. Although authors R. H. Gibson and Maurice Prendergast report that C7 sank UC-68 with that torpedo, C7 had in fact fired upon UB-10, and the explosion noted by C7 was her own torpedo prematurely exploding; UB-10 was able to continue on and make port in Zeebrugge. Later in the month, von Rohrscheidt sank two Dutch ships on the 24th and 25th: Minister Tak Van Poortvliet, a 1,106-ton steamer headed for Harlingen was sent down 20 nautical miles (37 km; 23 mi) off Ymuiden; the sailing ship Elizabeth was sunk between Lowestoft and Zeebrugge the following day.

On 20 August, UB-10—with Oblt.z.S. Fritz Gregor at the helm—sank Edernian, a British vessel, 6 nautical miles (11 km; 6.9 mi) from Southwold. The 3,588-ton ship, sent down with her cargo of steel and 14 of her crew, was the second largest sunk by UB-10. Early the next month, Gregor led the boat in sinking three more fishing vessels: the Belgian Jeannot and the British Unity on the 5th; and the British Rosary on the 6th. These were the last ships sunk by UB-10.

== Conversion to minelayer ==
UB-10 and three sister boats, UB-12, UB-16, and UB-17, were all converted to minelaying submarines by 1918. The conversion involved removing the bow section containing the pair of torpedo tubes from each U-boat and replacing it with a new bow containing four mine chutes capable of carrying two mines each. In the process, the boats were lengthened to 105 feet (32 m), and the displacement increased to 147 t (145 long tons) on the surface, and 161 t (158 long tons) below the surface. Exactly when this conversion was performed on UB-10 is not reported, but UB-12 was converted in late 1916. (Note: The conversion would have to have taken place after the sinking of Edernian—which was torpedoed—in August 1917, because the conversion removed UB-10's torpedo tubes.)

From late February to mid-May 1918, UB-10 was commanded by Oblt.z.S. Hans Joachim Emsmann. The 25-year-old Emmsman would later be notable as the commander of UB-116, the last U-boat sunk during the war, and as the namesake of the 5th U-boat Flotilla (German: 5. Unterseebootsflottille "Emmsman") of the Kriegsmarine in World War II.

On 2 July, UB-10 and UB-88 were both seriously damaged during a heavy British air raid on German-held bases in Flanders. During other raids, considerable damage to harbour facilities delayed repairs and impaired the flotilla's ability to operate at full strength. Although sources do not indicate whether the damage to UB-10's was repaired after this attack or not, by early September the boat was considered unfit for service and was decommissioned on the 12th.

After the Meuse-Argonne Offensive started on 26 September and the Allies began to drive back the German lines, plans were made to evacuate Flanders and dismantle the naval facilities at Bruges, Zeebrugge, and Ostend. All the vessels that were seaworthy were ordered to depart Flanders for Germany on 1 October; those unable to make the journey under their own power were to be destroyed. UB-10 was one of four U-boats left behind. (Note: The other three were UB-40, UB-59, and UC-4.) On 5 October, a maintenance crew scuttled UB-10 off the Zeebrugge Mole at position 51°21′N 3°12′E.

== Summary of raiding history ==
Ships sunk or damaged by SM UB-10
Date	Name	Nationality	Tonnage (Note: Merchant ship tonnages are in gross register tons. Military vessels are listed by tons displacement)	Fate
14 April 1915	Katwijk	Netherlands	2,040	Sunk
7 June 1915	Menapier	Belgium	1,886	Sunk
30 July 1915	Achieve	United Kingdom	43	Sunk
30 July 1915	Athena	United Kingdom	45	Sunk
30 July 1915	Coriander	United Kingdom	46	Sunk
30 July 1915	Fitzgerald	United Kingdom	51	Sunk
30 July 1915	Prospector	United Kingdom	59	Sunk
30 July 1915	Quest	United Kingdom	46	Sunk
30 July 1915	Strive	United Kingdom	63	Sunk
30 July 1915	Venture	United Kingdom	44	Sunk
1 August 1915	Alert	United Kingdom	59	Sunk
1 August 1915	Fulgens	United Kingdom	2,512	Sunk
8 August 1915	Arbor Vitae	United Kingdom	26	Sunk
6 August 1915	Xmas Rose	United Kingdom	27	Sunk
10 August 1915	Rosalie	United Kingdom	4,243	Sunk
10 August 1915	Esperance	United Kingdom	46	Sunk
11 August 1915	George Borrow	United Kingdom	62	Sunk
11 August 1915	George Crabbe	United Kingdom	42	Sunk
11 August 1915	Humphrey	United Kingdom	41	Sunk
11 August 1915	Illustrious	United Kingdom	59	Sunk
11 August 1915	Oceans Gift	United Kingdom	60	Sunk
11 August 1915	Palm	United Kingdom	47	Sunk
11 August 1915	Trevear	United Kingdom	47	Sunk
11 August 1915	Welcome	United Kingdom	59	Sunk
11 August 1915	Young Admiral	United Kingdom	60	Sunk
20 December 1915	Belford	United Kingdom	516	Sunk
20 December 1915	Huntly	United Kingdom	1,153	Sunk
19 March 1916	Port Dalhousie	Canada	1,744	Sunk
1 April 1916	Peter Hamre	Norway	1,081	Sunk
13 August 1916	HMS Lassoo	Royal Navy	1,010	Sunk
27 March 1917	Amstelstromm	Netherlands	1,413	Sunk
24 April 1917	Minister Tak Van Poortvliet	Netherlands	1,106	Sunk
25 April 1917	Elizabeth	Netherlands	147	Sunk
20 August 1917	Edernian	United Kingdom	3,588	Sunk
5 September 1917	Jeannot	Belgium	50	Sunk
5 September 1917	Unity	United Kingdom	56	Sunk
6 September 1917	Rosary	United Kingdom	37	Sunk
		Total:	23,614	

== Bibliography ==
- Bendert, Harald (2000). Die UB-Boote der Kaiserlichen Marine, 1914-1918. Einsätze, Erfolge, Schicksal (in German). Hamburg: Verlag E.S. Mittler & Sohn GmbH. ISBN 3-8132-0713-7.
- Gröner, Erich; Jung, Dieter; Maass, Martin (1991). German Warships 1815–1945, U-boats and Mine Warfare Vessels. Vol. 2. Translated by Thomas, Keith; Magowan, Rachel. London: Conway Maritime Press. ISBN 0-85177-593-4.
- Abbenhuis, Maartje M. (2006). The Art of Staying Neutral the Netherlands in the First World War, 1914–1918. Amsterdam: Amsterdam University Press. ISBN 978-1-4294-5416-2. OCLC 85831125.
- Gardiner, Robert; Gray, Randal, eds. (1985). Conway's All the World's Fighting Ships 1906–1921. Annapolis, Maryland: Naval Institute Press. ISBN 978-0-87021-907-8. OCLC 12119866.
- Gibson, R. H.; Maurice Prendergast (2003) [1931]. The German Submarine War, 1914–1918. Annapolis, Maryland: Naval Institute Press. ISBN 9781591143147. OCLC 52924732.
- Halpern, Paul G. (1994). A Naval History of World War I. Annapolis, Maryland: Naval Institute Press. ISBN 978-1-55750-352-7. OCLC 57447525.
- Karau, Mark D. (2003). Wielding the Dagger: the MarineKorps Flandern and the German War Effort, 1914–1918. Westport, Connecticut: Praeger. ISBN 978-0-313-32475-8. OCLC 51204317.
- McCartney, Innes (2003). Lost Patrols: Submarine Wrecks of the English Channel. Penzance: Periscope. ISBN 978-1-904381-04-4. OCLC 224045134.
- Messimer, Dwight R. (2002). Verschollen: World War I U-boat Losses. Annapolis, Maryland: Naval Institute Press. ISBN 978-1-55750-475-3. OCLC 231973419.
- Miller, David (2002). The Illustrated Directory of Submarines of the World. St. Paul, Minnesota: MBI Pub. Co. ISBN 978-0-7603-1345-9. OCLC 50208951.
- Tarrant, V. E. (1989). The U-Boat Offensive: 1914–1945. Annapolis, Maryland: Naval Institute Press. ISBN 978-0-87021-764-7. OCLC 20338385.
- Williamson, Gordon (2002). U-boats of the Kaiser's Navy. Oxford: Osprey. ISBN 978-1-84176-362-0. OCLC 48627495.
