= SS Galicia (1901) =

1901 British cargo liner

History
- Name: (United Kingdom of Great Britain and Ireland) Galicia
- Namesake: Galicia
- Owner: Pacific Steam Navigation Company
- Port of registry: (United Kingdom of Great Britain and Ireland) Liverpool, United Kingdom
- Builder: Wigham Richardson & Co., Ltd.
- Yard number: 363
- Completed: 1901
- Acquired: 1901
- In service: 1901
- Out of service: 12 May 1917
- Identification: Official number: 113487; Call sign: SMVW
- Fate: Struck a mine and sunk on 12 May 1917

General characteristics
- Type: Cargo liner
- Tonnage: 5,922 GRT
- Length: 122.1 metres (400 ft 7 in)
- Beam: 15.2 metres (49 ft 10 in)
- Depth: 10.1 metres (33 ft 2 in)
- Installed power: Two 3 cyl. triple expansion steam engines
- Propulsion: Two screws
- Sail plan: Liverpool - Valparaíso
- Speed: 14 knots
- Notes: Two masts and a single funnel

SS Galicia was a British Cargo liner that struck a mine laid by the German submarine UC-17 and sank on 12 May 1917 in the English Channel 3 nautical miles (5.6 km) east of Teignmouth, Devon, while she was travelling from Liverpool, United Kingdom to Valparaíso, Chile while carrying mail and general cargo.

== Construction ==
Galicia was built as the sistership of Potosi at the Wigham Richardson shipyard in Newcastle, United Kingdom and completed in 1901. The ship was 122.1 metres (400 ft 7 in) long, had a beam of 15.2 metres (49 ft 10 in) and a depth of 10.1 metres (33 ft 2 in). She was assessed at 5,922 GRT and had two 3cyl. Triple expansion steam engines driving two screw propellers that could achieve a speed of 14 knots.

== Career & Loss ==
Galicia entered service in 1901 for the Liverpool to Valparaíso route for the Pacific Steam Navigation Company. She remained in service during World War I and struck a mine in the English Channel 2 nautical miles (3.7 km) off the North Goodwin Lightship on 31 July 1915 while she was travelling from London to Liverpool. The Captain beached the damaged Galicia to save her from sinking and the ship was successfully refloated, repaired and returned to service. Galicia went on to hit another mine on 12 May 1917 in the English Channel 3 nautical miles (5.6 km) east of Teignmouth, Devon, while she was travelling from Liverpool, United Kingdom to Valparaíso, Chile while carrying mail, cement, cloth and Ammunition. This time, the ship couldn't be saved and she sank without the loss of life as her 59 passengers and crew were rescued by a Teignmouth lifeboat, a tug and a naval auxiliary ship.

== Wreck ==
Galicia lies upright in 18 metres (59 ft 1 in) of water and was heavily salvaged and dispersed with explosives in 1923 as parts of the wreck stuck out of the water, which presented a hazard to shipping. The wreck now lies strewn over a large area and is well broken up with only some features such as boiler tubes, masts and part of her cement and cloth cargo remaining recognizable. The wreck is used as an entry level training dive site.
