= HMS E16 =

Submarine of the Royal Navy

History

United Kingdom
- Name: E16
- Builder: Vickers, Barrow
- Cost: £105,700 (UK£ 7,950,000 in 2025)
- Laid down: 15 May 1913
- Launched: 23 September 1914
- Commissioned: 27 February 1915
- Fate: Mined in Heligoland Bight, 22 August 1916

General characteristics
- Class & type: E-class submarine
- Displacement: 662 long tons (673 t) (surfaced); 807 long tons (820 t) (submerged)
- Length: 181 ft (55 m)
- Beam: 15 ft (4.6 m)
- Propulsion: 2 × 800 hp (597 kW) diesels; 2 × 420 hp (313 kW) electric; 2 screws
- Speed: 15.25 knots (28.24 km/h; 17.55 mph) surfaced; 10.25 knots (18.98 km/h; 11.80 mph) submerged
- Range: 3,000 nmi (5,600 km) at 10 kn (19 km/h; 12 mph); 65 nmi (120 km) at 5 kn (9.3 km/h; 5.8 mph)
- Complement: 3 officers, 28 ratings
- Crew: 31
- Armament: 5 × 18 inch (450 mm) torpedo tubes (2 bow, 2 beam, 1 stern); 1 × 12-pounder gun

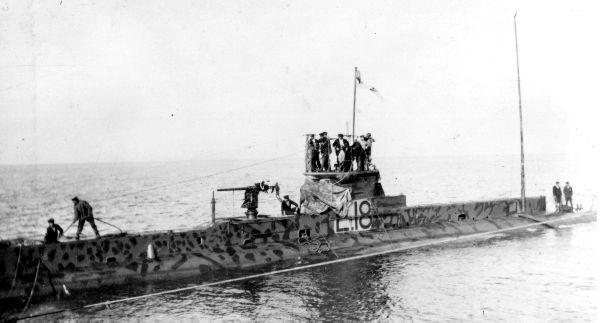
HMS E18 in 1915 (Royal Navy Submarine Museum photographic collection).

HMS E16 was an E-class submarine built by Vickers, Barrow-in-Furness for the Royal Navy. She was laid down on 15 May 1913 and was commissioned on 27 February 1915. Her hull cost £105,700. E16 was the first E-class to sink a U-boat, U-6, sunk 4 miles (6.4 km) south-west of Karmøy island off Stavanger, Norway on 15 September 1915. E16 was sunk by a mine in Heligoland Bight on 22 August 1916. There were no survivors.

== Design ==
Like all post-E8 British E-class submarines, E16 had a displacement of 662 long tons (673 t) at the surface and 807 long tons (820 t) while submerged. She had a total length of 180 feet (55 m) and a beam of 22 feet 8.5 inches (6.922 m). She was powered by two 800 horsepower (600 kW) Vickers eight-cylinder two-stroke diesel engines and two 420 horsepower (310 kW) electric motors. The submarine had a maximum surface speed of 16 knots (30 km/h; 18 mph) and a submerged speed of 10 knots (19 km/h; 12 mph). British E-class submarines had fuel capacities of 50 long tons (51 t) of diesel and ranges of 3,255 miles (5,238 km; 2,829 nmi) when travelling at 10 knots (19 km/h; 12 mph). E16 was capable of operating submerged for five hours when travelling at 5 knots (9.3 km/h; 5.8 mph).

As with most of the early E class boats, E16 was not fitted with a deck gun during construction but may have had one fitted later, forward of the conning tower. She had five 18 inch (450 mm) torpedo tubes, two in the bow, one either side amidships, and one in the stern; a total of 10 torpedoes were carried.

E-Class submarines had wireless systems with 1 kilowatt (1.3 hp) power ratings; in some submarines, these were later upgraded to 3 kilowatts (4.0 hp) systems by removing a midship torpedo tube. Their maximum design depth was 100 feet (30 m) although in service some reached depths of below 200 feet (61 m). Some submarines contained Fessenden oscillator systems.

== Crew ==
Her complement was three officers and 28 men.
