= SS Euphrate =

1905 French passenger ship

History
- Name: (France) Euphrate
- Namesake: Euphrates
- Owner: Messageries Maritimes
- Port of registry: Paris, France
- Ordered: 25 October 1902
- Builder: Messageries Maritimes
- Yard number: 120
- Launched: 24 April 1905
- Completed: December 1905
- Acquired: December 1905
- Maiden voyage: 30 December 1905
- In service: 1905
- Out of service: 11 July 1915
- Fate: Ran aground and wrecked on 11 July 1915

General characteristics
- Type: Passenger ship
- Tonnage: 6,880 GRT
- Length: 141.3 metres (463 ft 7 in)
- Beam: 16.1 metres (52 ft 10 in)
- Installed power: Two triple expansion engines
- Propulsion: Two screws
- Sail plan: Marseille - Saigon - Haiphong
- Speed: 13 knots
- Capacity: Accommodation for 1,294 passengers (40 in First class, 54 in Second class & 1,200 in Steerage)
- Notes: Two masts and a single funnel

SS Euphrate was a French Passenger ship that ran aground off Socotra Island in the Indian Ocean and was wrecked during a storm on 11 July 1915 without the loss of life. The ship's 536 passengers, 400 troops and crew were rescued by City of Nagpur, Collegian and Tambora.

== Construction ==
Euphrate was built at the Messageries Maritimes shipyard in La Ciotat, France and launched on 24 April 1905 before being completed in December of that same year. The ship was 141.3 metres (463 ft 7 in) long and had a beam of 16.1 metres (52 ft 10 in). She was assessed at 6,880 GRT and had two triple expansion engines driving two screw propellers that could achieve a speed of 13 knots. The ship had accommodation for 1,294 passengers including 40 in First class, 54 in Second class & 1,200 in Steerage. Euphrate had three sisterships: Gange, El Kantara and Louqsor.

== Career & Loss ==
Euphrate entered service on 30 December 1905 for the Messageries Maritimes as she departed Dunkirk for China and Japan. She served this rout until 1907, when the ship was instead used for the Marseille to Saigon and Haiphong route. When World War I broke out in 1914, the ship was requisitioned to be used for postal service between France and the Far East. It was during a voyage from the Far East back to France with 581 passengers and 400 military personnel on board, that the ship ran aground in a monsoon storm off Socotra Island in the Indian Ocean at 4 am on 11 July 1915. The ship's starboard planking was torn for several meters and her engine room flooded while its emergency battery overturned. This meant that the ship had no radio to send out a distress signal, so instead a lifeboat was crewed and launched to seek assistance offshore. The lifeboat encountered the British passenger ship City of Nagpur, which arrived at the site and managed to rescue 496 survivors before the English steamer Collegian and the Dutch liner Tambora arrived to assist further in the rescue efforts. Over the next three days, all passengers and crew of Euphrate were rescued, but the ship itself was declared a total loss.
