= SS Ellesmere =

Smalle frieghter from the First World War

History
- Name: Ellesmere
- Owner: Watson Steamship Co.
- Port of registry: (United Kingdom) Manchester
- Builder: Anderson Rodger and Company, Port Glasgow, Scotland
- Launched: 18 October 1906
- Completed: 22 November 1906
- Identification: Official number: 119600
- Fate: Sunk by submarine, 7 July 1915

General characteristics
- Type: Freighter
- Tonnage: 1,170 gross register tons (GRT); 729 net register tons (NRT)
- Length: 244.6 ft (74.6 m)
- Beam: 36 ft (11 m)
- Draught: 15.95 ft (4.9 m)
- Installed power: 173 nhp; 1,090 ihp (810 kW)
- Propulsion: 1 screw propeller; 1 triple-expansion steam engine
- Speed: 10.5 knots (19.4 km/h; 12.1 mph)

SS Ellesmere was a small freighter built during the First World War. Completed in 1915, she was intended for the West African trade. The ship was sunk by the German submarine SM U-20 in July 1915.

== Description ==
Ellesmere had an overall length of 244.6 feet (74.6 m), with a beam of 36 feet (11 m) and a draught of 15.95 feet (4.9 m). The ship was assessed at 1,170 gross register tons (GRT) and 729 net register tons (NRT). She had a vertical triple-expansion steam engine driving a single screw propeller. The engine was rated at a total of 173 nominal horsepower and produced 1,090 indicated horsepower (810 kW). This gave her a maximum speed of 10.5 knots (19.4 km/h; 12.1 mph).

== Construction and career ==
Ellesmere, named after Ellesmere, a lake near Ellesmere, Shropshire, was laid down as yard number 266 by Anderson Rodger and Company at its shipyard in Port Glasgow, Scotland, for the Watson Steamship Co. The ship was launched on 18 October 1906 and completed on 22 November. She was enroute to Manchester from Valencia, Spain, with a cargo of fruit when she was torpedoed and sunk by U-20 48 nautical miles (89 km; 55 mi) west of Smalls Lighthouse on 7 July 1915.

== Bibliography ==
- Fenton, Roy (December 2022). "Levers' Early Shipping Ventures: Bromport Steamship Co., Ltd. and its Predecessors". Marine News Supplement. 76 (12): S340–S352. ISSN 0966-6958.
