= SMS Seeadler (1915) =

1888 three-masted hulled sailing ship

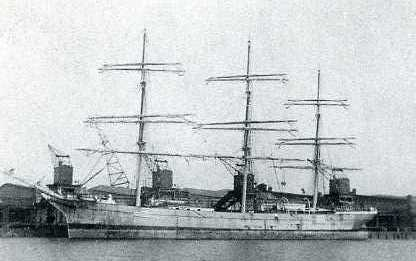
- Pass of Balmaha, later SMS Seeadler

History

United Kingdom
- Name: Pass of Balmaha
- Namesake: Pass of Balmaha
- Owner: 1888–1908 David R Clark (Messrs Gibson & Clark), Glasgow; 1908–1909 The River Plate Shipping Company Ltd, Montreal; 1909-1914 Ship Pass of Balmaha Company Ltd, Montreal
- Port of registry: Glasgow
- Builder: Robert Duncan and Company, Port Glasgow
- Yard number: 237
- Launched: 9 August 1888
- In service: 5 September 1888
- Out of service: 1914
- Identification: ON 95087
- Fate: Wrecked on 2 August 1917 on a reef at the island of Mopelia

United States
- Name: Pass of Balmaha
- Owner: Harby Steamship Company, New York
- Port of registry: Boston, Massachusetts
- Acquired: 1914
- Out of service: 1915

German Empire
- Name: SMS Seeadler
- Namesake: sea eagle
- Acquired: 1915
- Commissioned: 1915
- Fate: Wrecked 2 August 1917

General characteristics
- Displacement: 4500 tons (1,571 GRT)
- Length: 83.5 m (273 ft 11 in)
- Beam: 11.8 m (38 ft 9 in)
- Draught: 5.5 m (18 ft 1 in)
- Installed power: 900 hp (670 kW)
- Propulsion: 1 × auxiliary diesel engine; 1 × shaft
- Sail plan: 3 masts, full rig, 2,600 square metres (28,000 sq ft) sail area
- Speed: 9 kn (16.7 km/h; 10.4 mph) when using engine
- Complement: 64
- Armament: 2 × 105 mm (4.1 in) SK L/45 guns; 2 × 7.92 mm (0.3 in) MG 08 machine guns

SMS Seeadler (Ger: sea eagle) was a three-masted steel-hulled sailing ship. She was one of the last fighting sailing ships to be used in war when she served as a merchant raider with Imperial Germany in World War I. Built as the British-flagged Pass of Balmaha, she was captured by the German submarine SM U-36, and in 1916 converted to a commerce raider. As Seeadler she had a successful raiding career, capturing and sinking 15 ships in 225 days until she was wrecked, in 2 August 1917, in French Polynesia.

== Pass of Balmaha ==
The ship was launched as Pass of Balmaha by Robert Duncan & Company, Port Glasgow, Scotland, on 9 August 1888 as a steel-hulled ship-rigged sailing vessel measuring 1,571 gross register tons (GRT). She was 245 feet (75 m) long, 39 feet (12 m) in beam and with a depth of 23 feet (7.0 m). Delivered in the following month to the ownership of David R. Clark, a partner in Gibson & Clark, Glasgow, she was registered at that port with Official Number 95087 and signal letters KTRP.

In February 1908, Pass of Balmaha was sold at Leith by Gibson & Clark for £5,500 to The River Plate Shipping Company Ltd of Montreal. Her port of registry remained Glasgow, but she was managed by American interests in Boston, Massachusetts. By 1910, she had been transferred to the Ship Pass of Balmaha Company Ltd, Montreal, and under the management of George I Dewar, Toronto. Both of these companies were controlled by American shipping and lumber interests.

Soon after the outbreak of World War I in 1914 Pass of Balmaha was transferred to the neutral United States flag and registered at Boston in the ownership of the Harby Steamship Company Ltd of New York, part of the Harris-Irby Cotton Company.

=== Capture ===
Pass of Balmaha was captured by U-36 in the North Sea in 1915 under somewhat peculiar circumstances. She departed from New York Harbor in June 1915, bound for the Arctic port of Arkhangelsk with a cargo of cotton for Russia. She was intercepted by the British auxiliary cruiser Victorian off the coast of Norway. Victorian's captain led a boarding party to inspect the cargo for contraband. The British captain found reason for suspicion, and ordered Pass of Balmaha to sail to Kirkwall in the Orkney Islands for further inspection. A prize crew of an officer and six marines was left aboard to ensure compliance.

The British also ordered the neutral American colours struck and replaced with the British flag, against the will of Pass of Balmaha's Captain Scott, who realised that this would mark the ship as a belligerent. Soon after, U-36 intercepted Pass of Balmaha. To avoid being impounded, Scott hid the British prize crew in the hold and replaced the Union Jack with the Stars and Stripes. The commander of U-36, Captain Ernst Graeff, was not entirely convinced by this ruse and ordered Pass of Balmaha to sail for Cuxhaven for inspection. Since U-36 was short of personnel, the German prize crew consisted of only one man, Steuermannsmaat (Mate) Lamm. A German ensign was left aboard. Scott and his crew, resentful of what they perceived as British meddling, kept the British marines locked in the hold.

Pass of Balmaha reached Cuxhaven without major incident, and was boarded by a German inspection party. Captain Scott then revealed the British prize crew to the Germans, who took them prisoner. For their cooperation, the Americans were allowed free passage to a neutral country, but Pass of Balmaha became property of the German Navy.

== SMS Seeadler ==
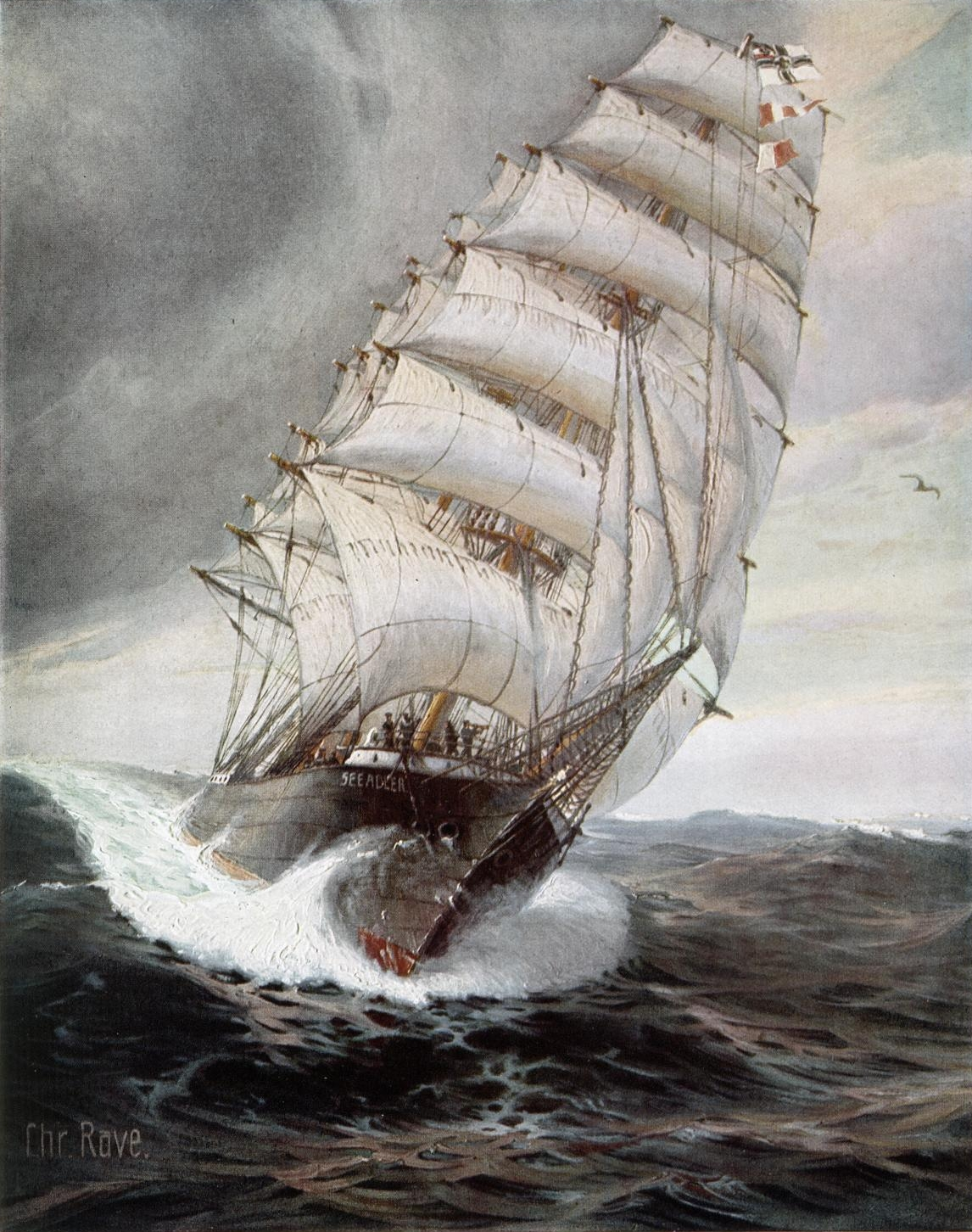
SMS Seeadler by Christopher Rave

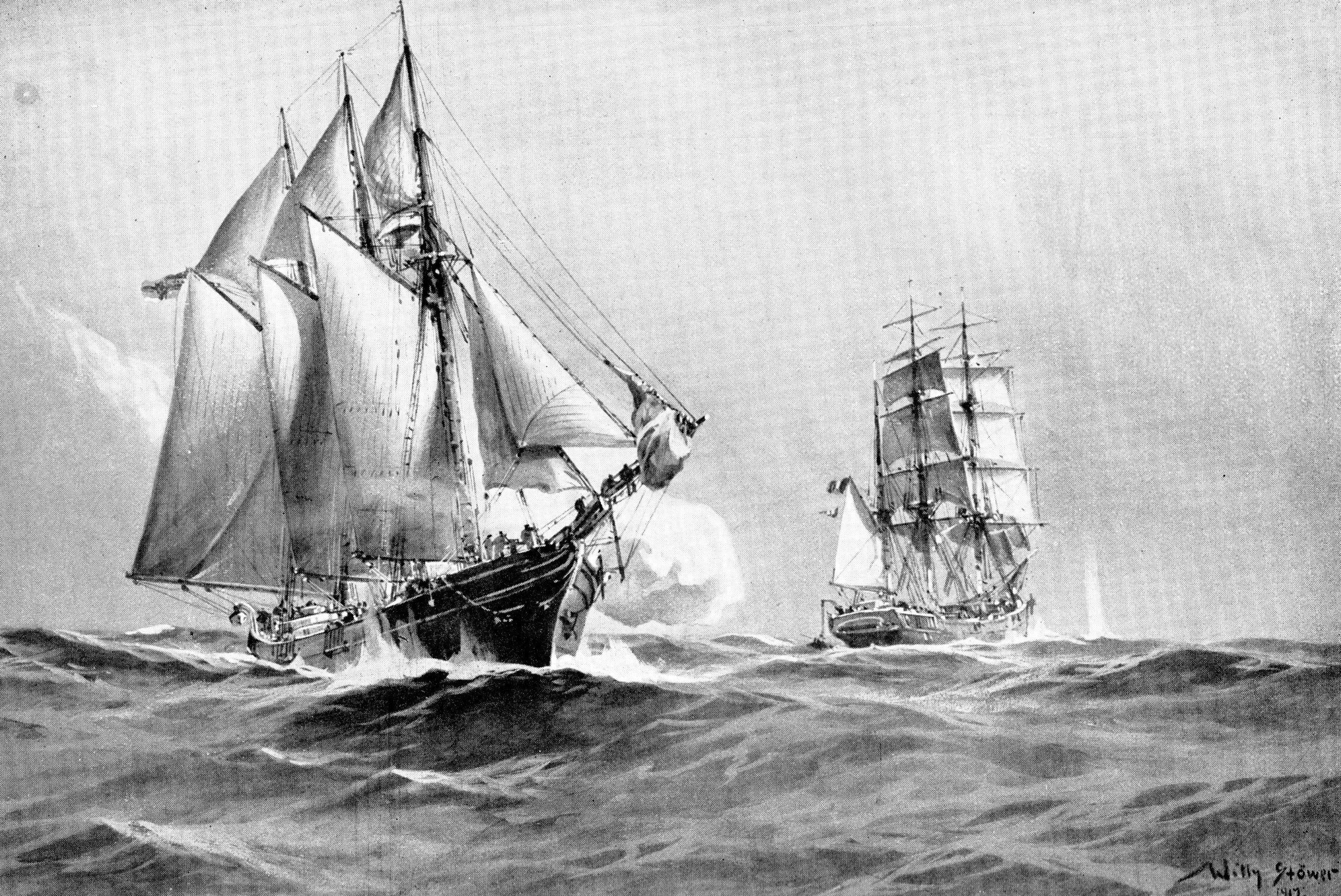
The German auxiliary cruiser SMS Seeadler capturing the French bark Cambronne off the Brazilian coast on 20 March 1917. Depicted by Willy Stöwer.

By 1916 the Allies had blockaded German warships in the North Sea, and any commerce raiders that succeeded in breaking out lacked foreign or colonial bases for resupply of coal. This gave rise to the idea of equipping a sailing ship instead, since it would not require coaling.

Seeadler was equipped with an auxiliary engine, hidden lounges, accommodation for additional crew and prisoners, two hidden 105 mm guns, mounted on either side of the forecastle, two hidden heavy machine guns, and rifles for boarding parties. These weapons were rarely fired, and many of the 15 ships encountered by Seeadler were sunk with only one single accidental casualty on either side during the entire journey.

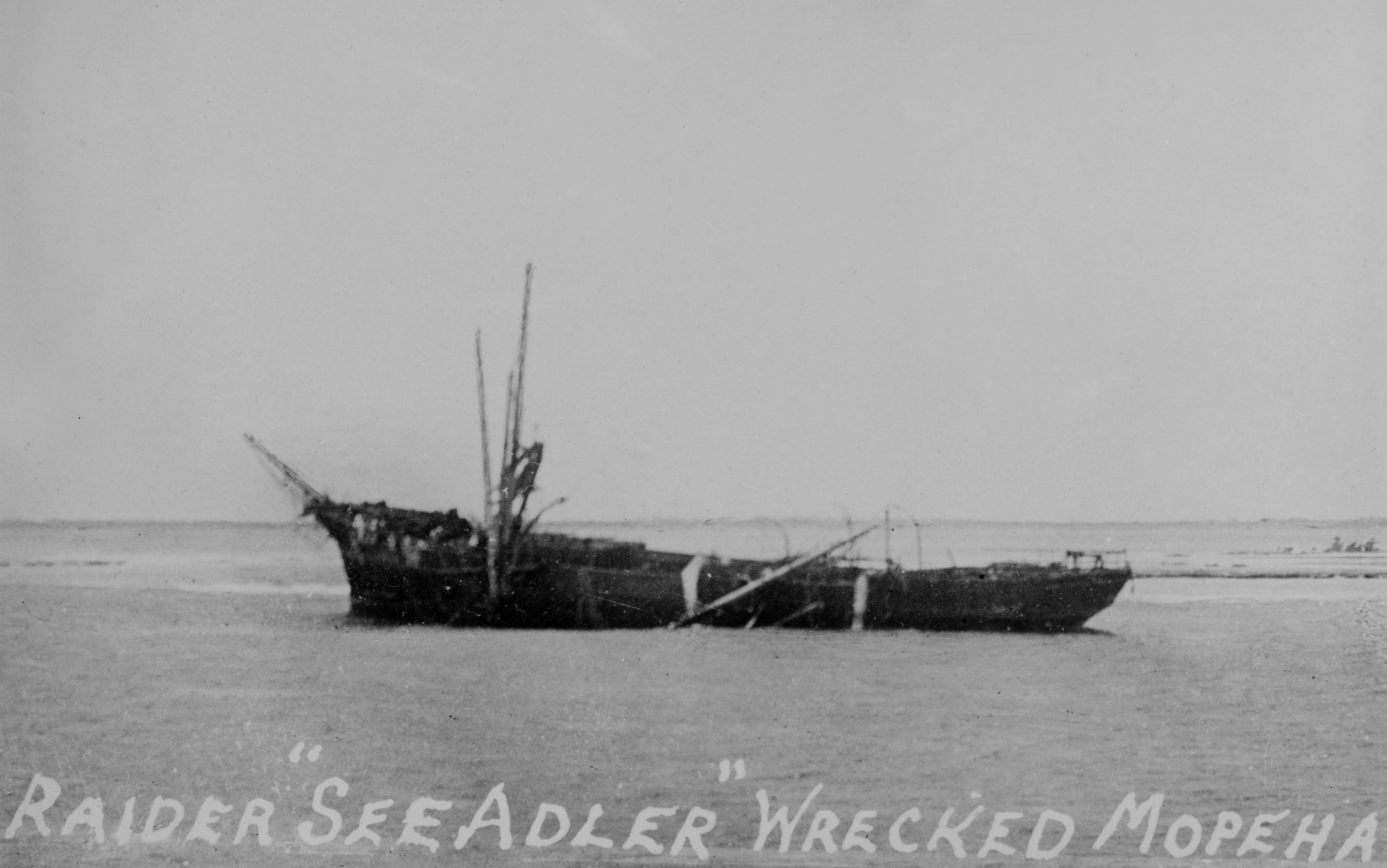
Seeadler wrecked

On 21 December 1916, she sailed under the command of Kapitänleutnant Felix von Luckner. The ship was disguised as a Norwegian wood carrier and succeeded in crossing the British blockading line despite being boarded for an inspection. The crew had been handpicked partly for their ability to speak Norwegian. Over the next 225 days, she captured 15 ships in the Atlantic and Pacific and led the British and US Navies on a merry chase.

Her journey ended wrecked on a reef at the island of Mopelia 450 kilometres (280 mi) from Tahiti in the Society Islands, part of French Polynesia. The ship needed maintenance so that her hull could be scraped clean but she was too big for Mopelia's harbour and so had to lay anchor outside the reef. Disaster struck when on 2 August 1917 a tsunami wave lifted the ship and smashed her on the reef, totally destroying the ship. No prisoners or crew were killed. The ship was burned in an attempt to hide their presence from Allied ships.

== Captured ships ==
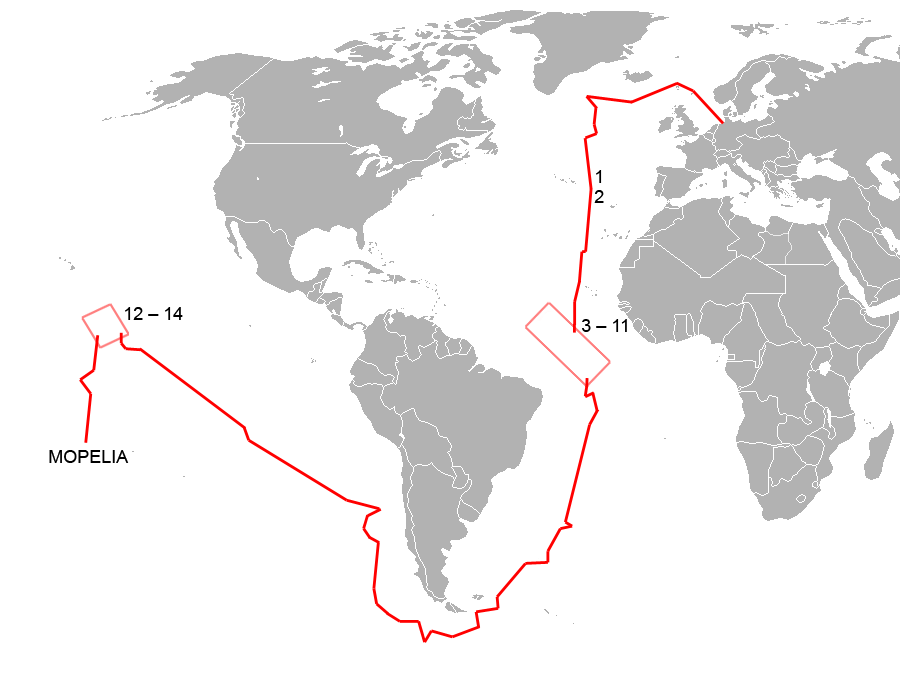
Route of SMS Seeadler and locations of ships engaged (1–2 North Atlantic, 3–11 Mid-Atlantic, 12–14 Pacific)

Sixteen ships, totalling 30,099 tons, were captured by Seeadler between 21 December 1916 and 8 September 1917.

| Ship name | Country | Ship type | Date | Size | Notes | References |
|---|---|---|---|---|---|---|
| Gladis Royle | United Kingdom | Cargo ship | 9 January 1917 | 3,268 tons | captured and sunk | |
| Lundy Island | United Kingdom | Cargo ship | 10 January 1917 | 3,095 tons | captured and sunk | |
| Charles Gounod | France | Barque | 21 January 1917 | 2,199 tons | captured and sunk | |
| Perce | Canada | Schooner | 24 January 1917 | 364 tons | captured and sunk | |
| Antonin | France | Barque | 3 February 1917 | 3,071 tons | captured and sunk | |
| Buenos Ayres | Italy | Sailing vessel | 9 February 1917 | 1,811 tons | captured and sunk | |
| Pinmore | United Kingdom | Schooner | 19 February 1917 | 2,431 tons | later sunk after being used to obtain supplies | |
| British Yeoman | United Kingdom | Sailing barque | 26 February 1917 | 1,953 | captured and sunk | |
| La Rochefoucauld | France | Barque | 27 February 1917 | 2,200 | captured and sunk | |
| Dupleix | France | Barque | 5 March 1917 | 2,206 tons | captured and sunk | |
| Horngarth | France | Cargo ship | 11 March 1917 | 3,609 tons | captured and sunk | |
| Cambronne | France | Barque | 21 March 1917 | 1,833 tons | captured and released 21 March, arrived at Rio de Janeiro, Brazil on 30 March 1917. | |
| A. B. Johnson | United States | Schooner | 14 June 1917 | 529 tons | captured and sunk | |
| R. C. Slade | United States | Schooner | 18 June 1917 | 673 tons | captured and sunk | |
| Manila | United States | Schooner | 8 July 1917 | 731 tons | captured and sunk | |
| Lutece | France | Schooner | September 1917 | 126 tons | captured by crew after SMS Seeadler was wrecked, renamed Fortuna | |

== Crew and POWs after the scuttling of SMS Seeadler ==
=== Captain Felix von Luckner ===
The different voyages of SMS Seeadler and her crew

On 23 August 1917 Felix von Luckner and five of his crew sailed for Fiji on one of Seeadler's open boats. In Fiji, they were captured and imprisoned. Luckner spent his time as a prisoner of war (POW) on Motuihe Island which lies between Motutapu and Waiheke islands in the Hauraki Gulf of New Zealand, near Auckland. On 13 December 1917 he stole the prison commander's motor boat and seized the 90-ton scow Moa. Allied ships were able to guess his destination and arrested him on 21 December 1917.

=== Leutnant Kling and the remaining crew ===
On Mopelia, the remaining 58 crew of SMS Seeadler that were left behind by Luckner heard of his arrest on the ship's radio. A small French schooner Lutece, of 126 tons, anchored outside the reef, lured to the island by the idea of salvaging the wreckage of the Seeadler. The Germans were able to board and seize the ship, its crew left with the other POWs on the island. On 5 September 1917, they set sail for South America after renaming the ship Fortuna. They sailed to Easter Island as Fortuna, arriving on 4 October and running aground there, after which they were interned by the Chilean authorities.

=== POWs left behind ===
After being abandoned by Leutnant Alfred Kling when they sailed off on the Fortuna, the master of the 14th ship SMS Seeadler sank, the A. B. Johnson, Captain Smith, then took the remaining open boat from Seeadler. He set off from Mopelia with three other American seamen, and sailed 1,600 km (990 mi) to Pago Pago, arriving on 4 October 1917, where they were finally able to inform the authorities of the activities of Seeadler and arrange for the rescue of the other 44 sailors left stranded on Mopelia.

== See also ==
- USS Irene Forsyte, a steam/sail ship used by the US Navy as a Q-ship in World War II

== Bibliography ==
Notes

References

- Allen, Oliver E. and the editors of Time-Life Books. 1978. Captain Sea Devil of the "Seeadler". The Windjammers pp. 120–143. (The Seafarers, vol. 6.) Alexandria, VA: Time-Life Books.
- Hogg, Ian V. (2009). The A to Z of World War I. Scarecrow Press. ISBN 9780810868625. - Total pages: 322
- Lowell, Thomas. 1929. "The Sea Devil" London: Heinemann.
- Hoyt, Edwin P. 1969. "Count von Luckner : Knight of the Sea" (published in England in 1970 as "Sea Eagle") David McKay Co. Inc.
- Pardoe, Blaine. 2006. "The Cruise of the Sea Eagle: The Story of Imperial Germany's Gentleman Pirate" Crecy Publishing.
- Roark, Garland (1964). The Coin of Contraband - The True Story of United States Customs Investigator Al Scharff. Doubleday and Company. p. 13.
- Jefferson, Sam. 2017. "The Sea Devil: The Adventures of Count Felix von Luckner, the Last Raider under Sail" Osprey.
- Thomas, Lowell (2011). The Sea Devil - The Story Of Count Felix Von Luckner, The German War Raider. Read Books Limited. ISBN 9781446548196. - Total pages: 340
- Wrecksite (2021). "Seeadler SMS (raider) (+1917)". Wrecksite.
