= Boiler tube =

Boiler tubes are used in:

- Fire-tube boiler, a type of boiler in which hot gases from a fire pass through one or more tubes running through a sealed container of water
- Water-tube boiler, a type of boiler in which water circulates in tubes heated externally by hot gases from a fire
