= Otto Steinbrinck =

German industrialist and naval officer (1888–1949)

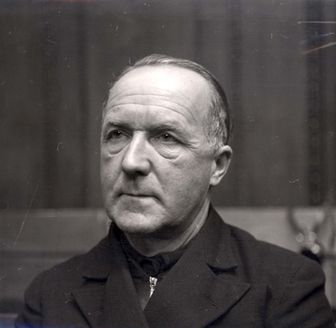
- Otto Steinbrinck
- Born: 19 December 1888; Lippstadt, Province of Westphalia, German Empire
- Died: 16 August 1949 (aged 60); Landsberg Prison, Landsberg am Lech, West Germany
- Military career
- Allegiance: German Empire; Nazi Germany
- Branch: German Imperial Navy; Schutzstaffel
- Service years: 1907–1919; 1933–1945
- Rank: Kapitänleutnant; Brigadeführer
- Commands: SM UB-10; SM UB-18; SM UC-65
- Conflicts: World War I World War II
- Awards: Pour le Mérite

Otto Steinbrinck (19 December 1888 – 16 August 1949) was a highly decorated World War I naval officer and German industrialist who was later indicted and found guilty in the Nuremberg Flick Trial.

Having had a very successful career as a U-boat commander in World War I, during which he won the much-coveted Pour le Mérite, Steinbrinck had a highly successful career in industry in the 1920s. Through the Freundeskreis Reichsführer SS, he cultivated relationships with the Third Reich's leading circles. Steinbrinck's leading position within the Flick conglomerate and his role in integrating coalmines and heavy industry in occupied West Europe into the German war economy were what in the end brought him before the court at Nuremberg.

== U-boat commander ==
The schoolteacher's son was from 1907 a professional soldier in the German Imperial Navy, and as of 1911 saw service on several submarines. His younger brother, Erich Steinbrinck, also served in the Navy until he was killed during the Battle of Jutland in 1916. In World War I, Steinbrinck was one of the most successful U-boat commanders; in 1916, he was decorated with the Pour le Mérite. He eventually sank 204 merchant ships totalling 233,072 gross register tons (GRT), as well as the protected cruiser HMS Ariadne and the submarine E22. However, in 1919, after the German Empire had lost the war, no further use could be found for him in the reconstituted Reichsmarine, and so he was discharged with the rank of Kapitänleutnant.

== Business career post-war ==
Steinbrinck served as a company director of the Organization of German Iron and Steel Industrialists, until he found a new post in 1924 at the Flick conglomerate, where he became First Associate in Friedrich Flick's private secretariat by 1925 and later rose to vice president. Steinbrinck also worked as a board member in many companies.

== Nazi career ==
In May 1933, Steinbrinck joined the National Socialist German Workers Party (NSDAP) and soon became a Standartenführer in the SS, later becoming an SS Oberführer in April 1935. Soon after that, he was a member in the so-called Freundeskreis des Reichsführers SS, a rather exclusive circle whose leader was Wilhelm Keppler. He contributed 100,000 Reichsmarks to Heinrich Himmler for "special purposes".

Between 1937 and 1939, Steinbrinck served as a general plenipotentiary for the Flick conglomerate. Moreover, he carried out various other functions, becoming in April 1938 a Wehrwirtschaftsführer (War Economy Leader) – a title given industrialists who were important to Germany's armament industry – and as of January 1939 a SS-Brigadeführer.

In the summer of 1939, he resigned from Flick and as of December of the same year began work as a trustee at Krupp. Shortly before this, he had also been remobilized as a frigate captain. From May 1940 until March 1942, Steinbrinck worked as a general plenipotentiary for the steel industry in Luxembourg, Belgium and France, and functioned in April 1941 as an associate in the presidium of the Reichsvereinigung Kohle (Reich Coal Association).

From March 1942 until the evacuation of the western occupation zones in the autumn of 1944, Steinbrinck was also general plenipotentiary for the Reichsvereinigung Kohle for mining and coal economy in the Netherlands, Belgium and France, the so-called Beko (Befehlskommando) West. This organization employed the use of slave labour. In April 1945 – World War II had by now long ago been lost – Steinbrinck operated as a link between Ruhr industry and Army Group B under Generalfeldmarschall Walter Model.

== Flick Trial ==
In August 1945, Steinbrinck was arrested by the Americans and faced charges at the so-called Flick Trial in Nuremberg. On 22 December 1947, he was sentenced to 5 years in prison. Steinbrinck died while serving his sentence at Landsberg Prison on 16 August 1949.
