= Piła =

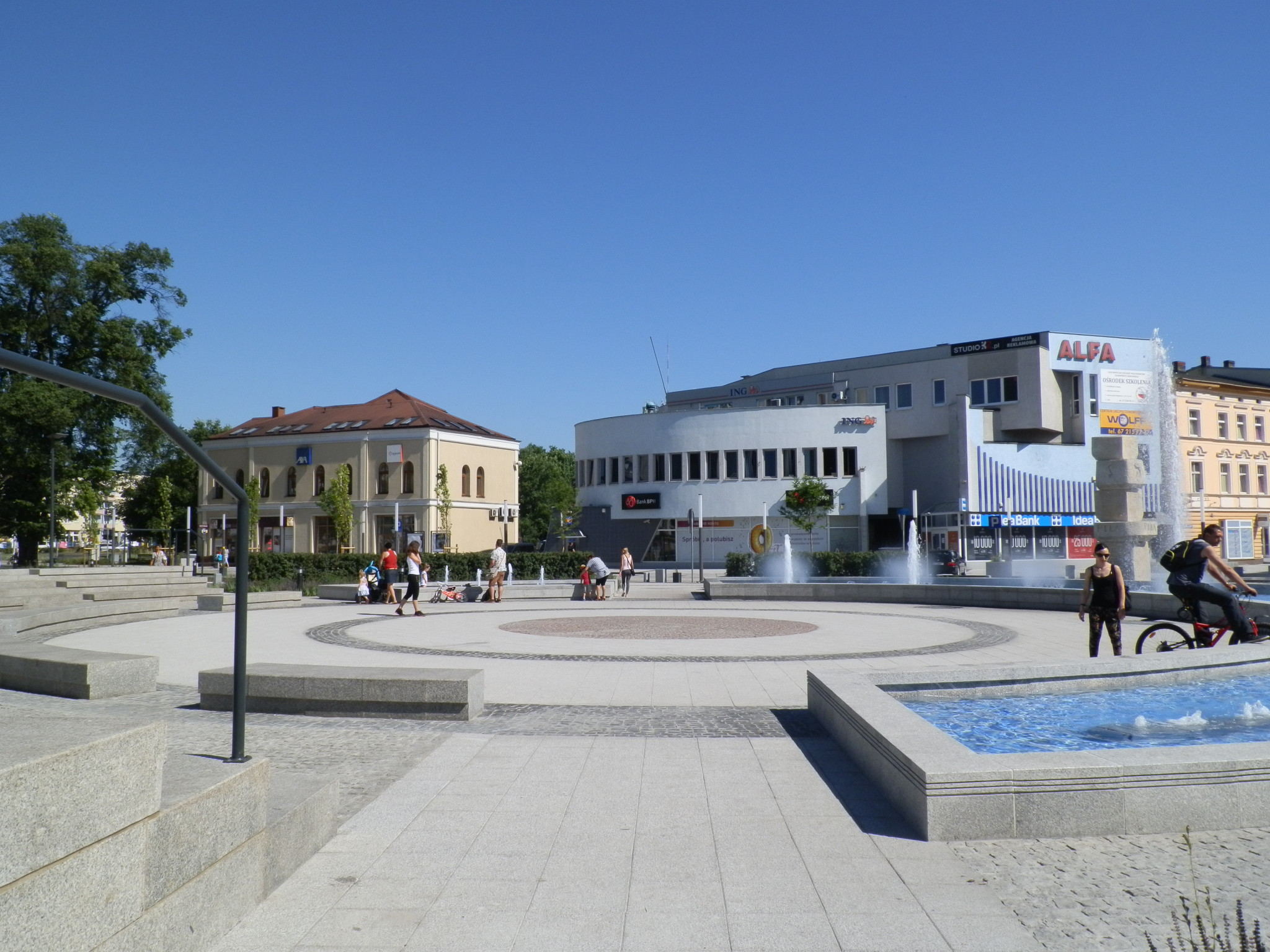
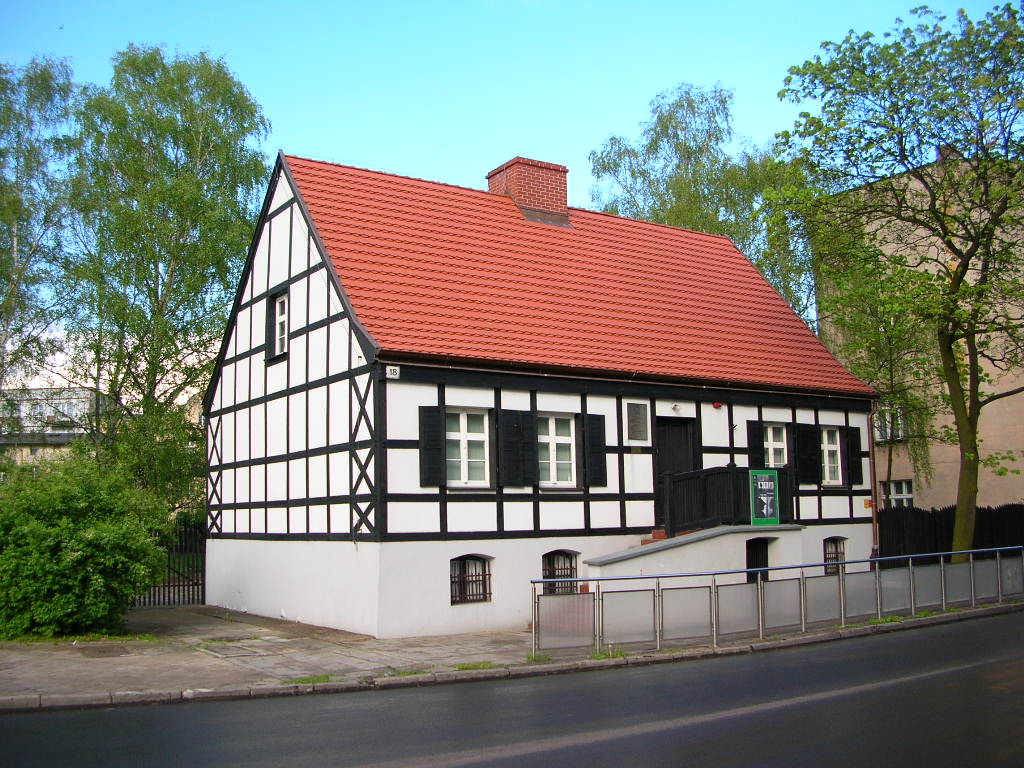
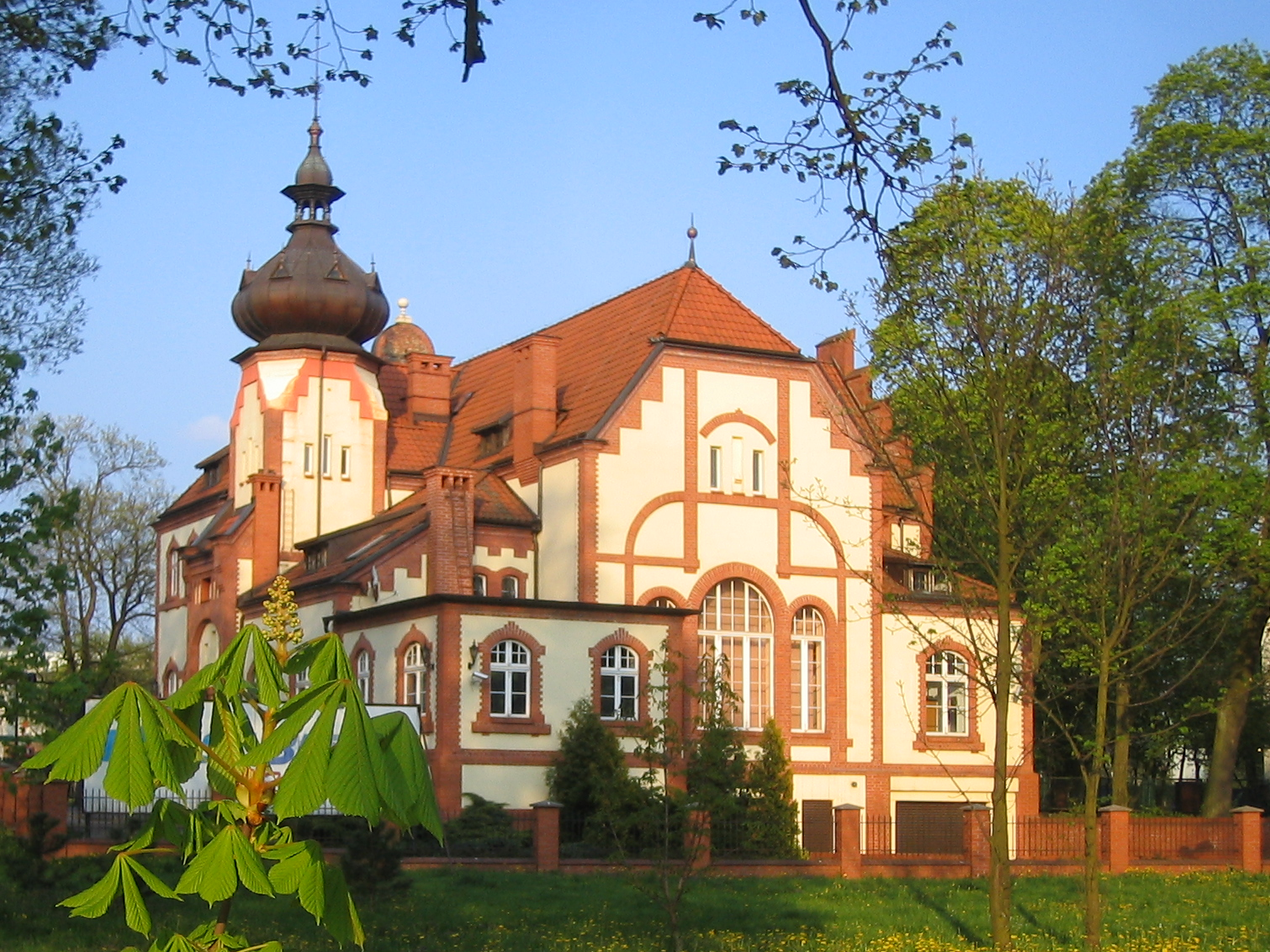
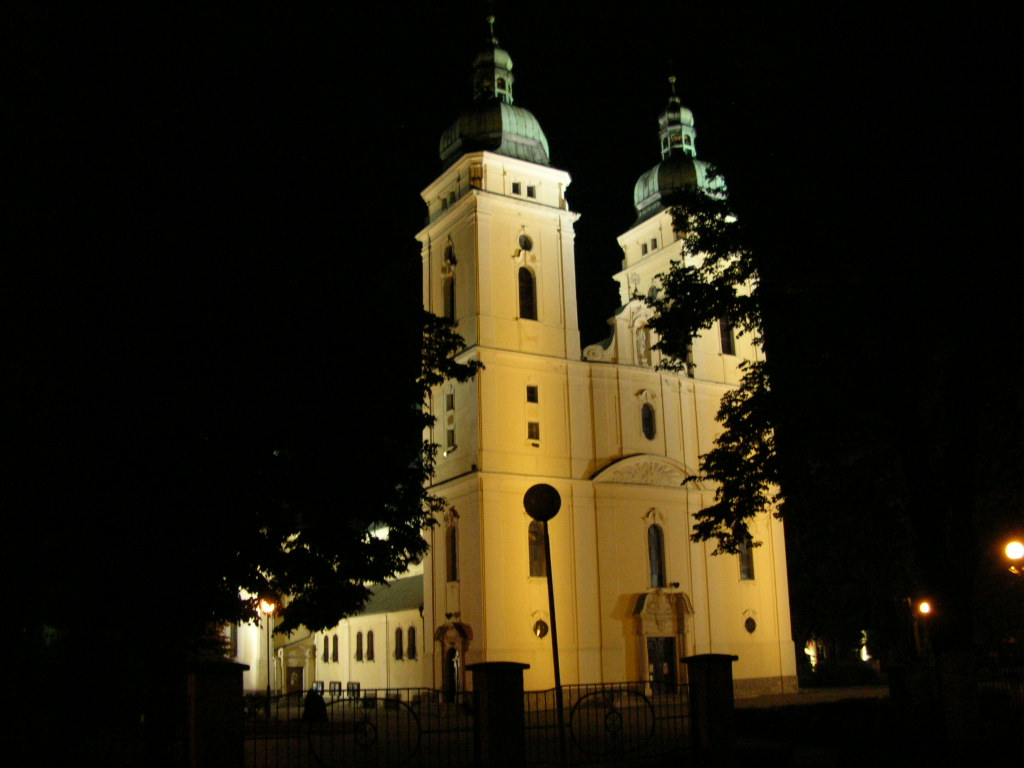
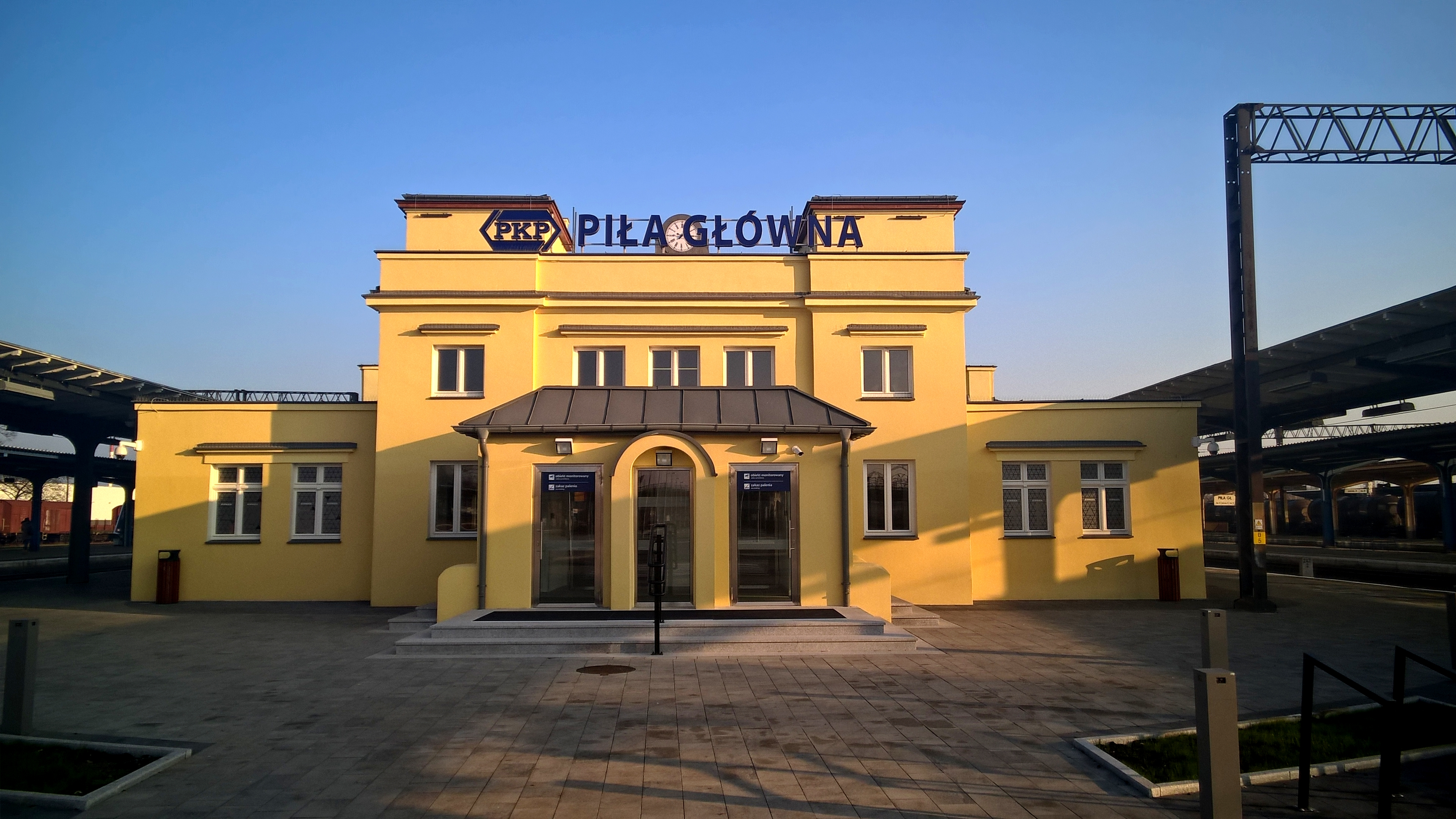
- City center Birthplace of Stanisław Staszic Former officers' mess Holy Family church Main railway station

- Flag Coat of arms

- Location within Greater Poland Voivodeship Location within Poland
- Coordinates: 53°9′N 16°44′E
- Country: Poland
- Voivodeship: Greater Poland
- County: Piła County
- Gmina: Piła (urban gmina)
- Established: 14th century
- Town rights: before 1449

Government
  - Mayor: Beata Dudzińska (nonpartisan/KO)

Area
  - Total: 103 km^{2} (40 sq mi)
- Highest elevation: 134 m (440 ft)
- Lowest elevation: 50 m (160 ft)

Population (31 December 2021)
  - Total: 71,846 ▼
- Time zone: UTC+1 (CET)
  - Summer (DST): UTC+2 (CEST)
- Postal code: 64-900, 64-920, 64-931, 64-933 to 64-935, 64-970
- Area code: +48 067
- Car plates: PP
- Climate: Dfb
- Website: http://www.pila.pl

Piła (Polish: [ˈpiwa]; German: Schneidemühl) is a city in northwestern Poland and the capital of Piła County, situated in the Greater Poland Voivodeship. Its population as of 2025 was 68,762, making it the third-largest city in the voivodeship after Poznań and Kalisz and the largest city in the northern part of Greater Poland. Piła is Poland's largest city without powiat rights.

Founded in the 14th century, Piła was a royal city of Poland, whose prosperity came from crafts and trade. The city is located on the Gwda river and is famous for its green areas, parks and dense forests nearby. It is an important road and railway hub, located at the intersection of two main lines: Poznań–Szczecin and Bydgoszcz–Krzyż Wielkopolski. Piła is the center of light industry, culture and education in northern Greater Poland, and is particularly known for motorcycle speedway racing.

== City name ==
Piła is a Polish word meaning "saw". This was a typical name denoting a village of woodcutters belonging to a local noble. The German name Schneidemühl means "sawmill".

== History ==
=== In the Kingdom of Poland ===
==== Overview ====
Piła traces its origins to an old fishing village. Following the German colonist movement of the 13th century, and particularly after the end of the first Mongol invasion of Poland of 1241, many German colonizers came to this densely wooded area of Poland. General immigration of German settlers diminished, however, when Poland, under King Casimir IV Jagiellon (1447–1492), finally defeated the Teutonic Order in 1466.

==== Early history ====
A Slavic settlement of woodcutters in the fishing village Piła may have existed before any of the later villages and surrounding towns of the area were established. Thus, in the 14th century Piła grew to some extent because of its position on the Gwda, a mere 11 kilometres (7 miles) from where it joins the river Notec. Yet, the settlement developed less than others that were on such major water routes as the rivers Warta or Vistula. Piła's simple layout of unpaved streets and primitive clay and timber houses gave little protection to its inhabitants and was still far from becoming a commercially interesting locale. If one were to credit a Privilegium (charter) of the early 1380s as evidence, a document associated with the building of a church in Piła and ascribed to the very young Queen Jadwiga of Poland—a copied document that still existed in the archives of the town before 1834—then that period could well be regarded as the time when the village of Piła/Snydemole was elevated to the status of town. The recurring double naming Piła-Snydemole may be because two originally separate localities took their name from the water-powered sawmill that had been part of the town's raison d'être from the beginning.

Documented references to Snydemole and Piła are reportedly found in parish church sources of 1449, where there is mention of a sawmill and of the name of the current wojewoda (governor) Paul. Evidence also exists of a letter from 1456 by the Brandenburg Friedrich II Hohenzollern who had bought the Neumark region from the Teutonic Order in 1455. The letter is addressed to bishop Andrzej of Poznań and to Łukasz Górka, the local Starosta, the royal constable of Wielkopolska. The elector complained that in prevailing peace times some burghers of Snydemole and Piła were making raids on his lands. This accusation may tend to give additional credence to the earlier claim that Queen Jadwiga in the 1380s was indeed the founder of the town of Piła.

==== City rights ====
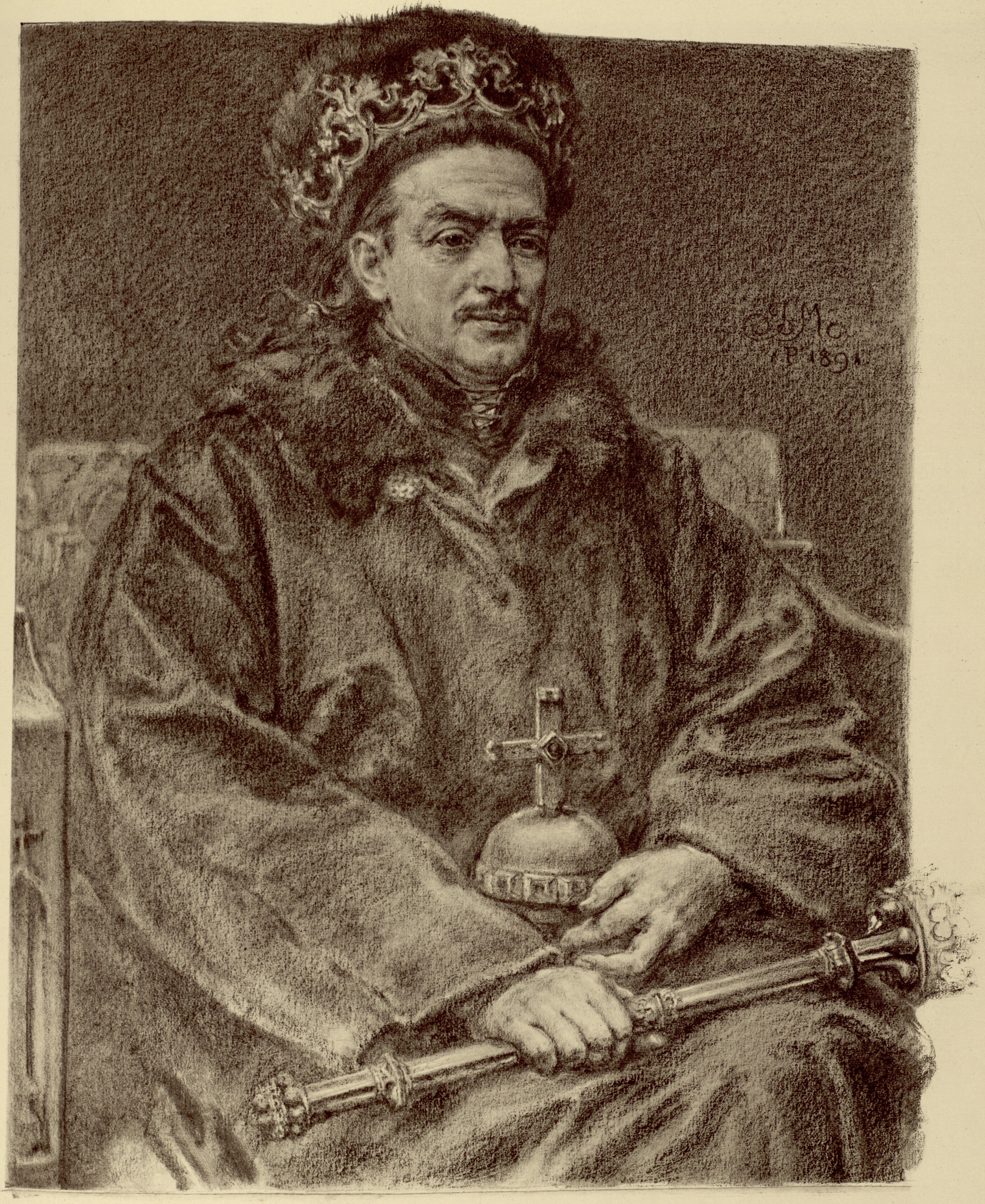
During the reign of King Casimir IV Jagiellon Piła became a royal city of the Kingdom of Poland

Until 1480 Piła was a town owned by the nobility, belonging to Maciej Opaliński who later presented his holdings to King Casimir IV Jagiellon, at which time Piła became a royal town. Administratively it was located in the Poznań County in the Poznań Voivodeship in the Greater Poland Province of the Kingdom of Poland. It is known that ten years later the burghers of the town were accused and penalized for tax evasion that had been occurring over a period of five years. However, King Sigismund I the Old—during whose reign immigration of numerous Jews from the Iberian Peninsula, Bohemia and German states was encouraged—bestowed municipal rights upon the town of Piła on 4 March 1513, a landmark decision. This was an important achievement for Piła since it gave the burghers not only status, but also the rights to self-administration and its own judiciary. The administration of the town's affairs was now in the hands of three legislative bodies, elected from among the burghers. They were the council with the mayor, jury court and the elders of the guilds. Only the position of the Wójt remained in the hands of the crown or its deputy, the Starosta. The sovereign, however, remained the ultimate judge, warlord and owner of the land. Being free from the arbitrariness of a Castellan or of Wojewoda (governor of the province)—Piła's town folk took advantage of the town's privileges by owning property, carrying on any trade and enjoying the right to hold much needed market fairs.

==== 16th century ====
Economic circumstances or personal feuds may have been responsible for the frequent changes of ownership of the town, as Piła was 'purchased' in 1518 by Hieronymus von Bnin; the document outlining the deed and ownership during his lifetime was given to him by King Sigismund I in 1525. Following the demise of Bnin, the town became the property of the dynasty of the mighty Gorka family. This family, secretly leaning toward Protestantism and in power until the 17th century, included some of the wealthiest landowners and most influential nobles of Poland and was known to be benevolent to their town's folk.

In 1548 Piła obtained a privilege that banned any foreign potter from the town's markets, and in 1561 a fishing privilege was obtained. Piła was part of the Poznań Voivodeship, the region divided into the four starostwa (land holdings) of Poznań, Kościan, Wschowa and Wałcz, the latter encompassing the Starosty Ujscie-Piła, the area between the rivers Gwda, Notec and Drage. Stara Piła, the old Piła, a town that never had walls, was slow to grow.

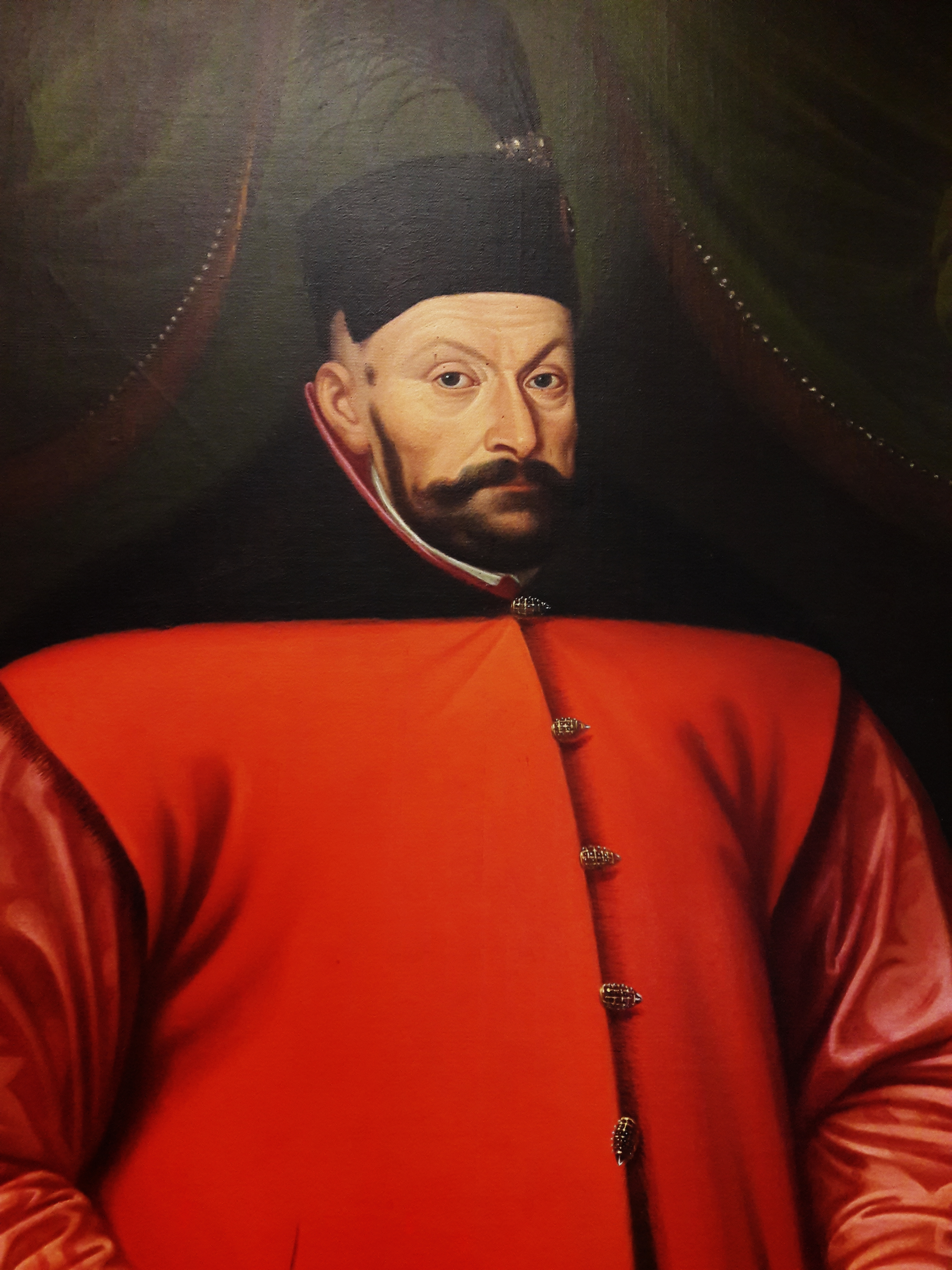
King Stephen Báthory confirmed old privileges of Piła in 1576 and moved the weekly market from Thursdays to Mondays

By the middle of the 16th century, many German Protestant craftsmen and traders, driven out of Bohemia by religious persecution during the Reformation, settled in numerous towns in the region. Some may have settled in Piła too, yet in 1563 the small town had no more than 750 inhabitants. They are known to have lived in 153 houses, primitively built, primarily with timber and clay, covered with straw and grouped mainly around the Old Market. When King Stephen Báthory of Poland confirmed two of the town's privileges on 3 September 1576, the burghers were granted the right to hold their weekly market on a Monday (instead of Thursday), an important feat. Over the following 150 years, numerous privileges and charters were re-issued by the Polish crown, mainly as a result of loss by fire. By 1591 a statute allowing apprenticeships in various trades was obtained. In 1593 King Sigismund III Vasa confirmed old privileges of Piła.

==== 17th century: Queen Constance reshaping the town ====
When the widowed Sigismund III Vasa married princess Constance, an Austrian archduchess from the House of Habsburg, in 1605, he presented the town of Piła, together with the lands of the domain of Ujście, as a wedding gift to his new bride. She became responsible for changing Piła in several ways over the next few decades. Acting in concert with the tenets of the prevailing Catholic Counter Reformation, the queen first attended to what seemed closest to her heart. She saw to it that numerous Protestant churches in the region of Wałcz, the most German of areas where seventeen Protestant villages existed, be handed over to the Roman Catholic clergy, hounding many a German Protestant burgher in the process.

After one of the town's frequent fires in 1619, the queen—in a benevolent gesture and as her 'present' to the burghers of Piła—appropriated funds from the large estate to have the old burnt-out wooden Catholic Church rebuilt. Alas, given the random, close proximity of houses to one another, town fires occurred with such regularity in numerous communities during that period that in 1626 another devastating fire broke out in Piła. This time the entire town was laid to ashes, including the newly built church. Constance subsequently charged her secretary Samuel Targowski on 15 July 1626 to survey what was left of the town. His proposal for a new layout was to be drastic for Christian burghers; to the developing Jewish community it was most consequential and of particular detriment. Constance also decided on a distinct segregation of Jews and Christians. The Jewish community was to resettle in a ghetto, what was to become a virtual town within a town. The new site, from thereon often referred to as Judenstadt, the Jews' town. To demarcate the newly created ghetto, the decree called for a sizable trench to be dug to surround the Jewish quarters where feasible; otherwise a tall wooden fence had to serve to close in the area completely.

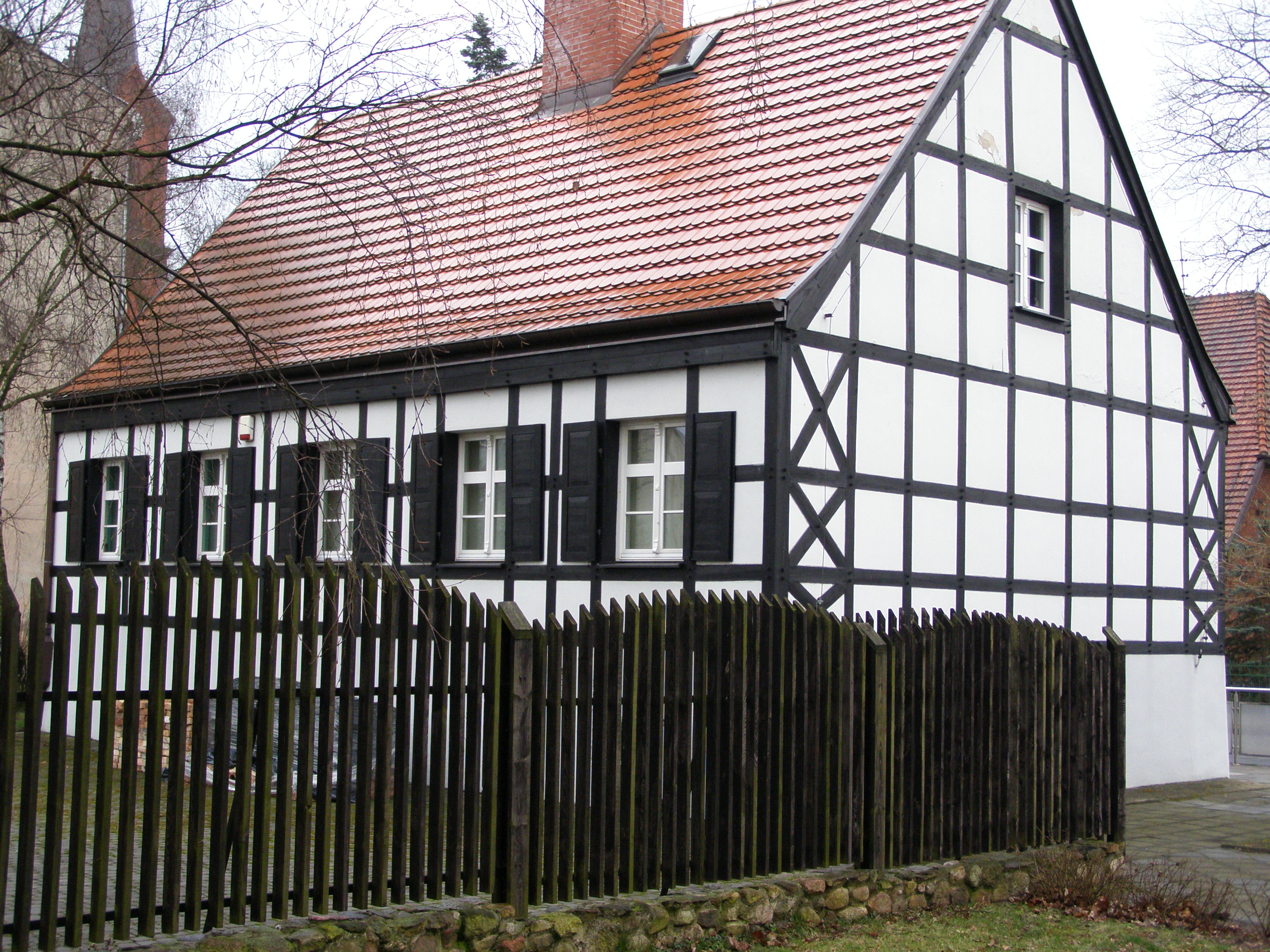
Birthplace of Stanisław Staszic, a leading figure of Polish Enlightenment

A new church arose in 1628. Unlike most other buildings in town, the choir room section of this edifice was to remain intact in its original form until 1945. New houses were constructed of brick and stone and the town was reconstructed in plain Renaissance style. Polish Kings confirmed old privileges of Piła again in 1633 and 1650, and granted new privileges in 1660, 1670 and 1688, which were then confirmed in 1716. On 24 July 1655, during the Deluge, Swedish troops captured the predominantly Lutheran town and destroyed most of its buildings and infrastructure. During October 1656, a Polish troupe of Stefan Czarniecki's army sought retribution upon the largely German and Protestant burghers of Piła, accusing them of collusion with the Swedes. During the consecutive Great Northern and Seven Years' Wars similar havoc was visited upon the remaining inhabitants. To add to the plight, it was discovered that the plague had been carried in.

=== In the Kingdom of Prussia and the Duchy of Warsaw ===
With the signing of the definitive treaty to divide Poland between Prussia, Austria and Russia in 1772, the First Partition of Poland was accomplished. Piła became part of the Kingdom of Prussia and was officially renamed Schneidemühl. After Frederick II of Prussia signed the Ownership Protocol of his Polish lands on 13 September 1772, he created out of the northern parts of Greater Poland and Kuyavia the Département Westpreussen. Part of that area was later also known as the Netzedistrikt, a governmental administrative district consisting of a wide strip of land both sides of the river Noteć (Netze), stretching from it source north of Września (Wreschen) to the border of the Neumark. Frederick II initiated new German Protestant colonization in opposition to Polish Catholics.

In the year 1781, another huge fire occurred, which devastated half the town. Although Prussian authorities had brought in chimney sweeps and regulations that spelled out fire emergency tasks, hardly anyone in the town was prepared for a major conflagration. 44 houses, 37 stables and 17 barns burned down.

In 1793 Piła was recaptured for a short period by a Polish army led by Colonel Wyganowski. Following Prussia's defeat in the battle of Jena and Greater Poland uprising (1806), and after signing the Peace of Tilsit of 7 July 1807, Piła became part of the semi-independent Polish Duchy of Warsaw.

=== 19th century: industrialization and railway hub ===
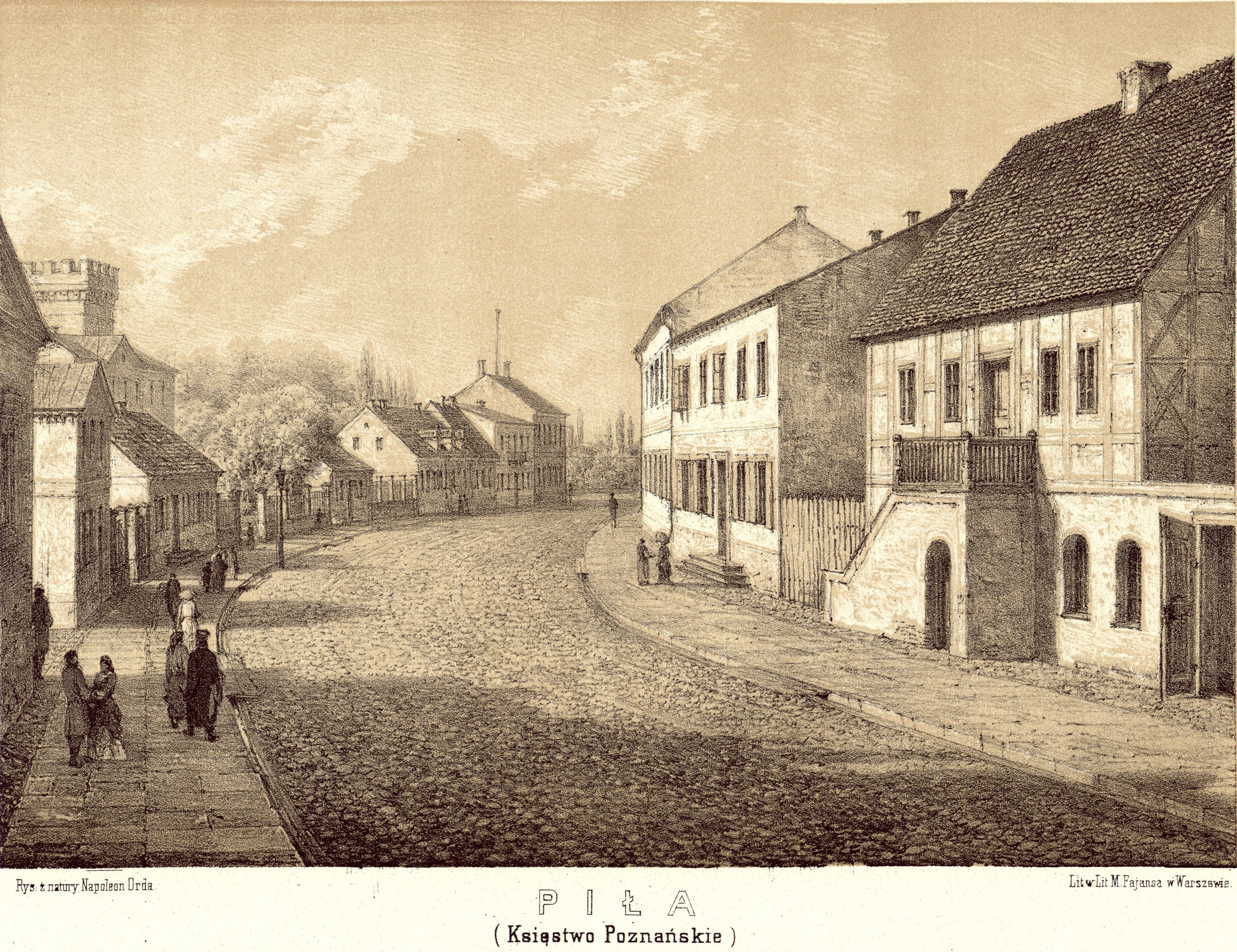
19th-century lithograph of the city

After the Congress of Vienna of 1815, Prussia regained the town once again. Under the Prussian administrative reforms of 1816–18, the town became part of the Kolmar District within the Bromberg Region of the Grand Duchy of Posen. On 1 January 1818 Kreis Kolmar was established, with its seat in Piła / Schneidemühl, which in 1821 was moved to Chodzież. One of the main escape routes for insurgents of the unsuccessful Polish November Uprising from partitioned Poland to the Great Emigration led through the city.

The Polish language was restricted from offices and education and the city saw a significant influx of German settlers. By 1834 Schneidemühl had barely recovered from the worst outbreak of cholera of 1831, an epidemic that affected the town's burghers to such an extent that a special Protestant cholera cemetery had to be laid out in the town's suburb Berliner Vorstadt. In the summer of 1834 the city was again struck by a fire that destroyed a large part of the city centre and the city archives. The city was rebuilt shortly afterwards.

In 1851 the city was connected to Berlin and Bydgoszcz (Bromberg) by the Prussian Eastern Railway. An architectural artifact which remains from the railway development period is a historical roundhouse.

The Germanisation policy of the Prussian and Imperial German government replaced its Polish identity with a German one. By the end of the 19th century the city had become one of the most important railway centers of the region and one of the biggest towns in the Province of Posen. It was turned into a Prussian military garrison town. Schneidemühl was revisited by a catastrophe, known as the Brunnenunglück, or the 'calamity of the well' that made national headlines. The drilling of an artesian well in August 1892 went horribly wrong and led to unexpected widespread flooding of many of the streets laid out in 1834, causing numerous houses to simply collapse and leaving more than eighty families without shelter. The worst was that this disaster came only a few years on the heels of unexpected flooding caused by the spring thaw of March 1888 that had turned the Küddow into a raging river, when many people were forced to use rowboats to navigate the streets.

==== First World War ====
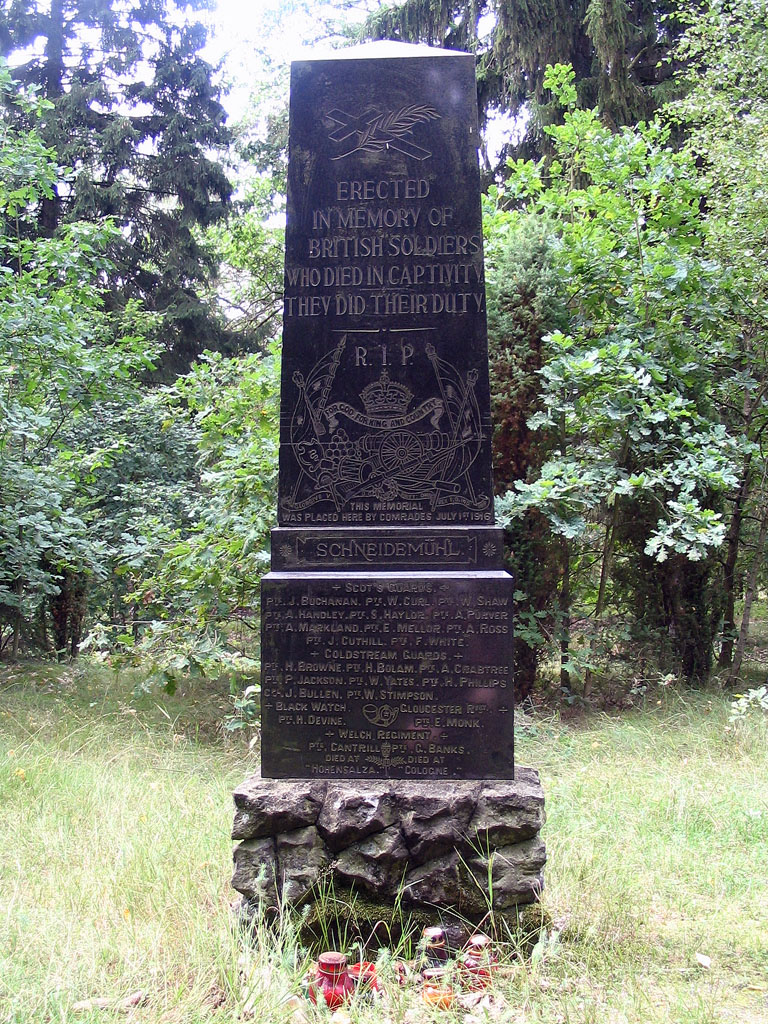
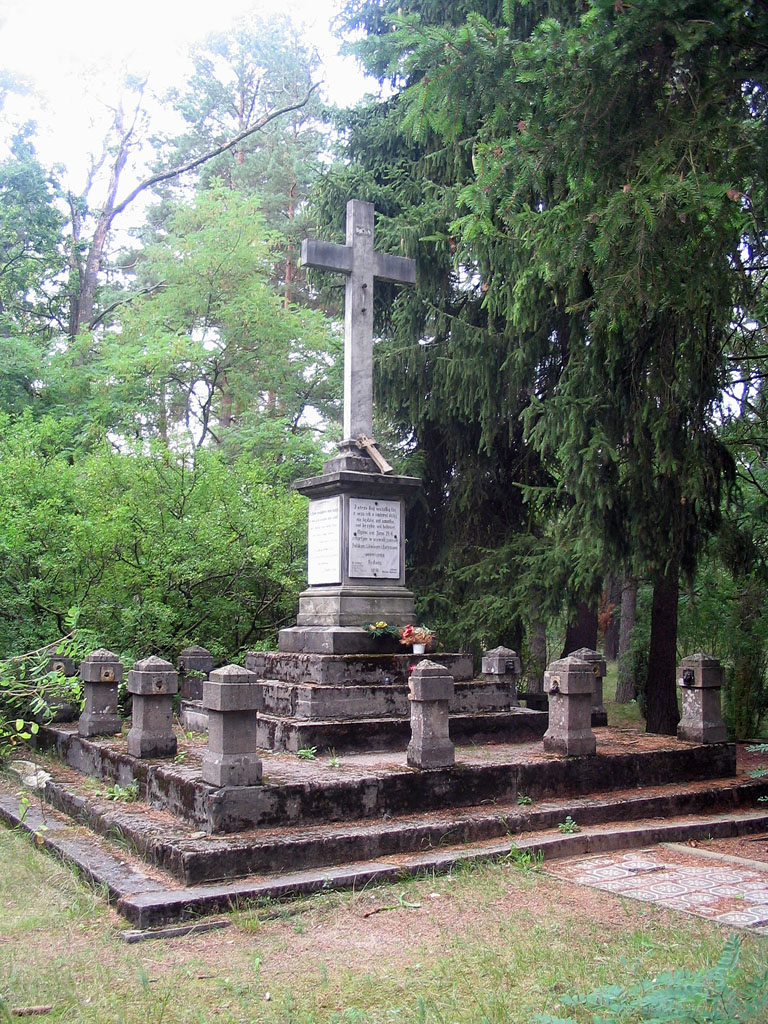
Memorials to British, Polish, Lithuanian and Latvian POWs who died in the local German POW camp during World War I

On 1 April 1914 Schneidemühl was disentangled from the Kolmar District and became an independent city (or urban district; Stadtkreis) within the Bromberg Region. In the months before the outbreak of World War I, in April 1914 the Albatros Flugzeugwerke established the so-called Ostdeutsche Albatros-Werke (East German Albatros Works, abbreviated "O.A.W.") in Schneidemühl for construction of military aircraft for the Fliegertruppe air service of the German Army throughout the war — it later undertook license production of Fokker's famous Fokker D.VII fighter during the last year of World War I.

During the First World War, the Germans operated a prisoner-of-war camp in the city, initially taking mainly Russian POWs (including Poles and Latvians conscripted into the Russian Army) but later including prisoners from most Allied nations including Britain and Australia. Over 2,600 POWs died in the camp and were buried at a newly founded prisoner of war cemetery. Among the victims were Britons, French, Poles, Lithuanians, Latvians, Russians, Tatars, and Jews. A telling account of life in the town during that period survives in the form of the diary of Piete Kuhr, then a young girl whose grandmother worked at the Red Cross canteen at the railway station.

=== As a provincial capital within the Weimar Republic ===
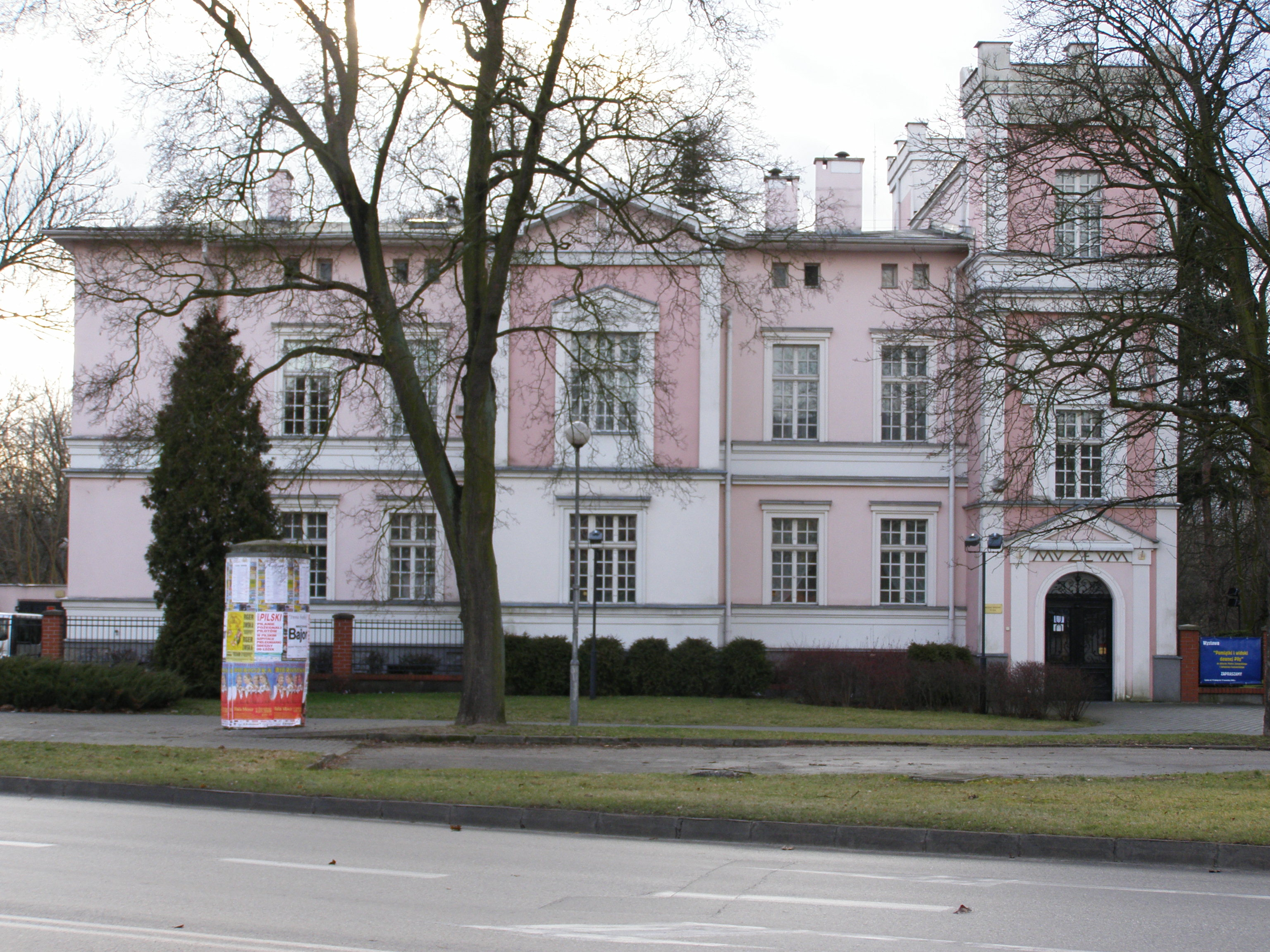
Pre-war Polish Consulate, today a museum

After World War I, in 1918, Poland regained independence, and the Greater Poland Uprising broke out, which aim was to reintegrate the region with Poland. Local Poles were persecuted for their pro-Polish stance by the Germans, who also held Polish insurgents in the local prison. After the signing of the Treaty of Versailles, and after much protest by the German majority of its population, Schneidemühl was not included in the Polish Second Republic. After the Greater Poland Uprising, the new Polish-German border ran five kilometres (3.1 miles) south of the city.

On 21 July 1922 Schneidemühl became the administrative centre of the new Frontier March of Posen-West Prussia Province, a body of self-rule encompassing those three disconnected parts of the former Province of Posen and the westernmost parts of the Province of West Prussia, which were not ceded to Poland and of the Posen-West Prussian Schneidemühl Region, a body of central government supervision comprising the same provincial area. In 1925, with the sudden influx of the Optanten, inhabitants of areas annexed by Poland who opted not to become Polish citizens and left for the reduced German Reich. Schneidemühl's population swelled by about 10,000 to 37,518, creating considerable publicity in Germany.

In 1930 Schneidemühl replaced Tütz (Tuczno) as seat of the Catholic jurisdiction, which was promoted from Apostolic administration to Territorial Prelature of Schneidemühl within the Eastern German Ecclesiastical Province. The city experienced a short period of growth followed by a period of decline in the early 1930s. High unemployment and the ineffectiveness of local administration led to rising support for the NSDAP.

=== Nazi rule and Second World War ===
With the onset of the Nazi period and the beginning of the Gestapo's harassment of political and racial undesirables, the climate for Schneidemühl's shrinking Jewish community (which had reached over 1,000 members during the mid-19th century) changed irreversibly — institutionalized antisemitism had arrived in Schneidemühl.

In March and September 1938, a Verwaltungsgliederung, or administrative reform, merged the three territorially unconnected parts of the Frontier March of Posen-West Prussia province into the respective neighbouring Prussian provinces of Brandenburg, Silesia and Pomerania — placing the bulk of former Posen-West Prussia with the districts of Deutsch Krone, Flatow, Netzekreis, Schlochau and Schneidemühl into Pomerania. Schneidemühl remained the headquarters of the government region, reduced by the districts ceded to Brandenburg and Silesia, but enlarged by four previously Brandenburgian and Pomeranian districts and renamed as Frontier March of Posen-West Prussia Region (Regierungsbezirk Grenzmark Posen-Westpreußen) for reasons of tradition, as of 1 October 1938.

During the pogrom of 9/10 November 1938 the freestanding structure of Schneidemühl's 100-year-old synagogue became a prime target for the Nazis who set fire to it. In 1939, in the city and the region, the Germans carried out mass arrests of Polish activists, who then were imprisoned in a temporary camp in the city before deportation to Nazi concentration camps, some were even tortured. In October 1939, a German camp for Sinti and Romani people was established. The city's 300-year-old Jewish community was destroyed when on 21 March 1940, on the order of Gauleiter Schwede-Coburg, the last remaining Jews, together with more than 500 Jews of the surrounding area within an 80 km (50 mi) radius, were arrested and held prisoner in various locations in the city. A large number of them were subsequently taken to the forced labour camp Radinkendorf and the Glowno prisoner camp outside of Poznań and held there in detention under inhuman conditions. Over the following two years they were taken to various labour camps, hospices, hospitals in Pomerania, Bielefeld and Berlin. Those who had not committed suicide or had perished during that period were deported to concentration camps, the last in 1943.

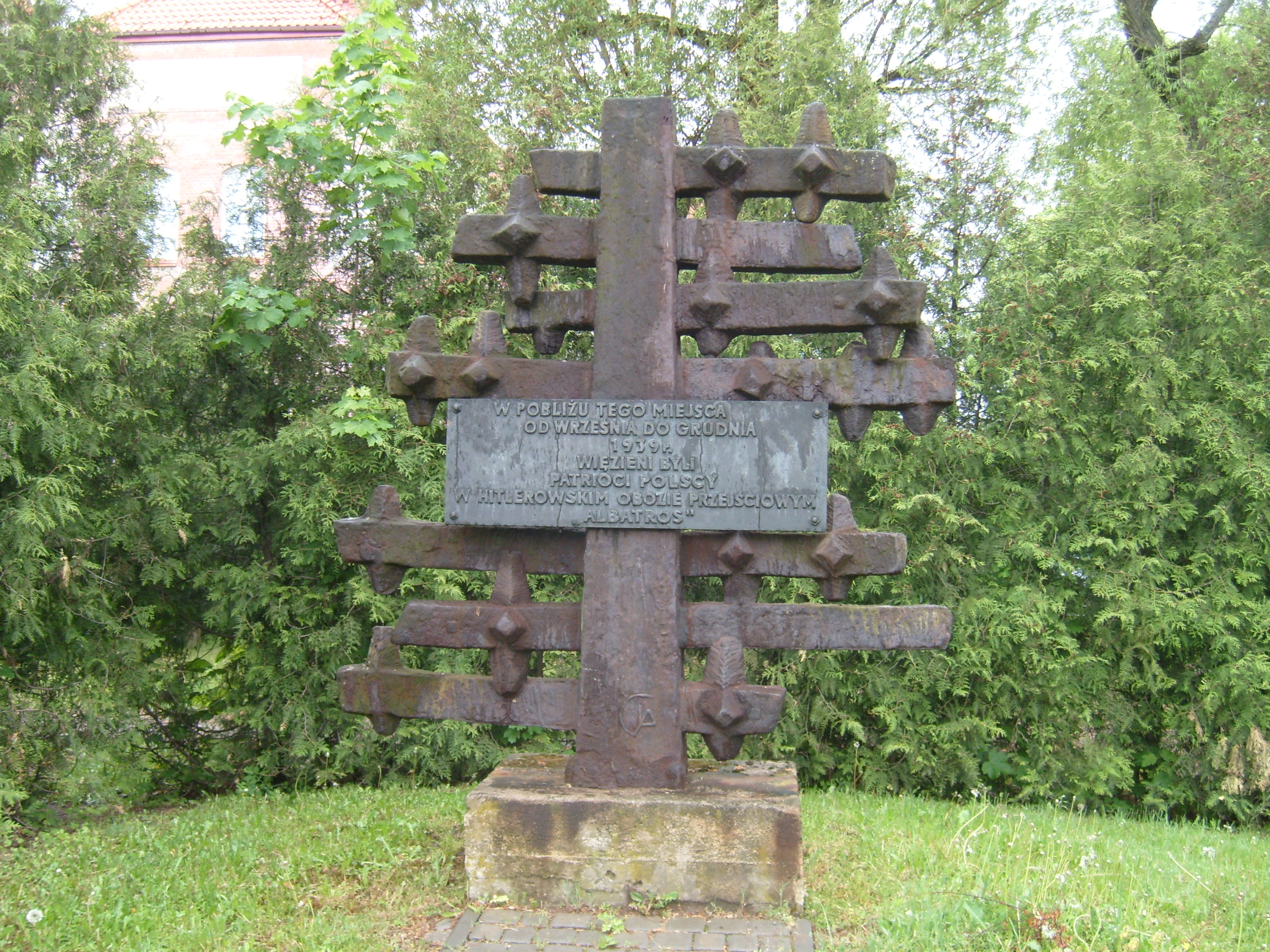
A monument commemorating Poles imprisoned in the German Nazi camp Albatros in 1939

During World War II a camp for civil prisoners-of-war named "Albatros" was established. Poles expelled from Gmina Dziemiany in Gdańsk Pomerania were used as forced labour in the local aviation industry. Also seven forced labour subcamps of the Stalag II-B prisoner-of-war camp and a forced labour camp, which was subordinate to the local prison, were operated in the city. Several British POWs escaped, and then the Polish resistance facilitated their further escape through the port of Gdynia by sea to Sweden. Four prisoners of war (two British, one Lithuanian, and one Belgian) who took part in the Great Escape from Stalag Luft III were captured by the Germans in the city, and later murdered elsewhere.

The Polish resistance was active in the city. One of the main contact points of the intelligence of the Pomeranian District of the Union of Armed Struggle and Home Army was based in the city. The Odra organization conducted espionage of German activity in the city, and the local Home Army maintained contact with Polish POWs held in the Oflag II-C camp. Several Polish resistance members were imprisoned in Piła, and over 15 were sentenced by a German court to death.

The city became part of the Pomeranian Wall line of fortifications. In 1945 the town was declared a fortress by Adolf Hitler. During the East Pomeranian offensive it was captured by the joint Polish and Red Army forces after two weeks of heavy fighting on 14 February 1945. 75% of the city was destroyed and almost 90% of the historic city centre was in ruins.

=== Post-war Poland ===
As a result of the border changes agreed at the Potsdam Conference in 1945, the city became again part of Poland, although with a Soviet-installed communist regime, which stayed in power until the Fall of Communism in the 1980s. The city's historic Polish name Piła was restored. The remaining local German population was expelled by Polish and Soviet troops from 1945 to 1948 in accordance with the Potsdam Agreement, while Polish expellees from former eastern Poland annexed by the Soviet Union and settlers from areas of central Poland, which were destroyed during the war, were resettled in the city. The historical city centre was only partially restored.

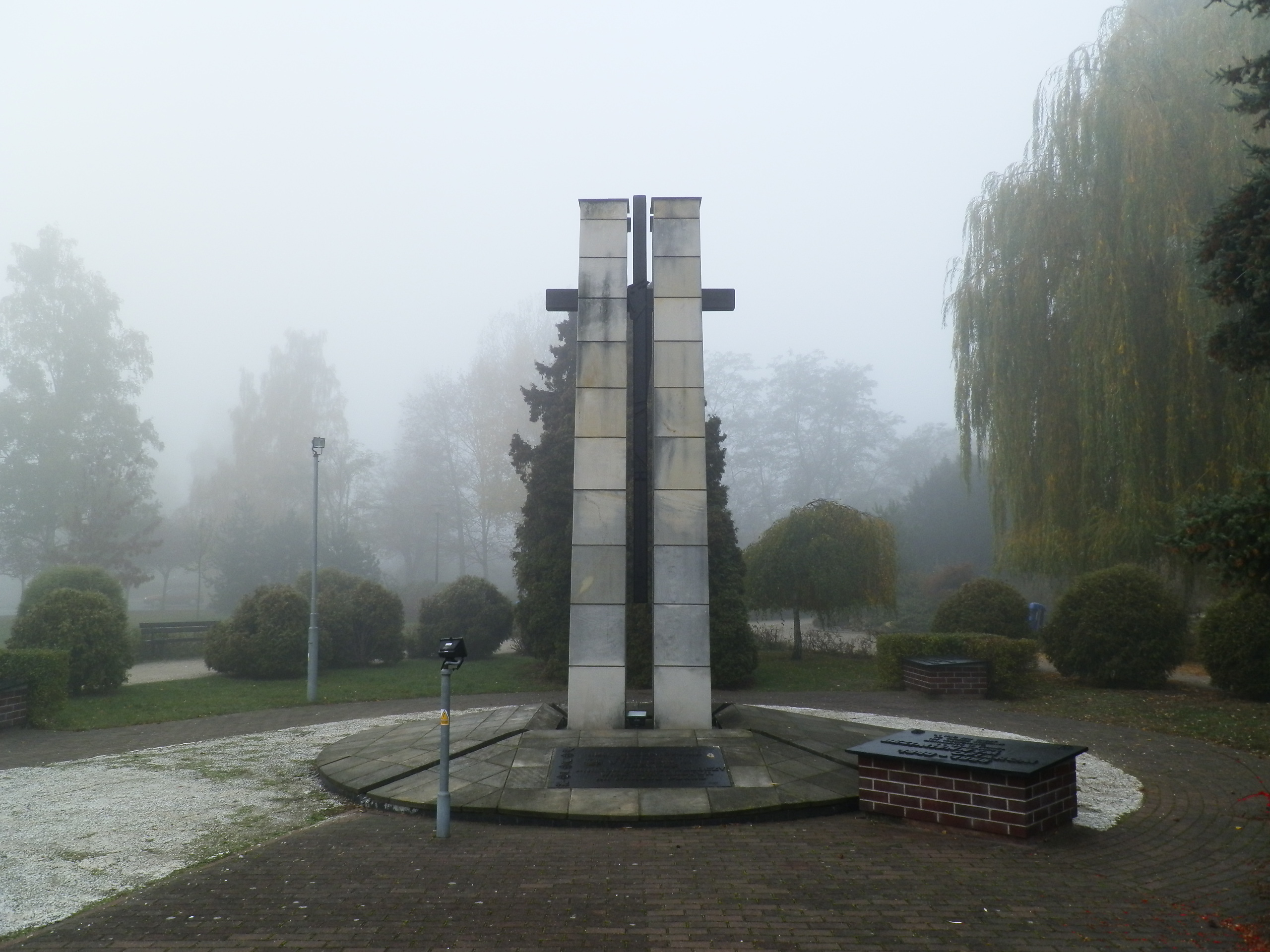
Monument to victims of communism

In the following years, the Polish anti-communist resistance was active in the city and its environs, including the regional Underground Security Police, the "Warta" Association of Former Partisans, the Polish Guard, the Fighters for Freedom of Poland, and the Gruda Home Army.

In 1972 the Territorial Prelature of Piła was suppressed, its territory being reassigned to establish the Diocese of Koszalin–Kołobrzeg and Diocese of Gorzów.

In August 1980, employees of local factories joined the nationwide anti-communist strikes, which led to the foundation of the Solidarity organization, which played a central role in the end of communist rule in Poland.

In 1975 Piła became the capital of the newly established Piła Voivodeship (province), which started a period of fast development of industry in the area as one of the most important cities of the region. It remained a voivodeship capital until the administrative reform of 1999. It is known for its green areas and parks, as well as for its speedway club Polonia Piła who race at the Stadion Polonii Piła.

== Demographics ==
Historical population

Year	Pop.	±%
1774	1,322	—
1816	1,992	+50.7%
1843	4,111	+106.4%
1856	6,060	+47.4%
1867	7,516	+24.0%
1875	9,724	+29.4%
1880	11,610	+19.4%
1900	19,655	+69.3%

Year	Pop.	±%
1910	26,126	+32.9%
1925	37,518	+43.6%
1933	43,180	+15.1%
1939	45,791	+6.0%
1948	10,700	−76.6%
1960	33,800	+215.9%
1970	43,700	+29.3%
1980	58,900	+34.8%

Year	Pop.	±%
1990	71,100	+20.7%
1995	75,700	+6.5%
2001	77,000	+1.7%
2005	74,600	−3.1%
2006	75,144	+0.7%
2016	74,102	−1.4%

== Geography ==
=== Climate ===
Climate in this area has mild differences between highs and lows, and there is adequate rainfall year-round. The Köppen Climate Classification subtype for this climate is "Cfb". (Marine West Coast Climate).

Climate data for Piła (1991–2020 normals, extremes 1970–present)
Month	Jan	Feb	Mar	Apr	May	Jun	Jul	Aug	Sep	Oct	Nov	Dec	Year
Record high °C (°F)	13.9 (57.0)	18.3 (64.9)	22.3 (72.1)	29.9 (85.8)	31.6 (88.9)	37.4 (99.3)	37.4 (99.3)	37.2 (99.0)	34.7 (94.5)	25.2 (77.4)	17.7 (63.9)	14.1 (57.4)	37.4 (99.3)
Mean daily maximum °C (°F)	1.8 (35.2)	3.4 (38.1)	7.8 (46.0)	14.6 (58.3)	19.4 (66.9)	22.6 (72.7)	24.8 (76.6)	24.4 (75.9)	19.0 (66.2)	12.9 (55.2)	6.5 (43.7)	2.9 (37.2)	13.3 (55.9)
Daily mean °C (°F)	−0.8 (30.6)	0.2 (32.4)	3.2 (37.8)	8.7 (47.7)	13.5 (56.3)	16.8 (62.2)	19.0 (66.2)	18.4 (65.1)	13.6 (56.5)	8.5 (47.3)	3.9 (39.0)	0.6 (33.1)	8.8 (47.8)
Mean daily minimum °C (°F)	−3.5 (25.7)	−2.9 (26.8)	−0.9 (30.4)	2.9 (37.2)	7.4 (45.3)	10.9 (51.6)	13.2 (55.8)	12.7 (54.9)	8.7 (47.7)	4.7 (40.5)	1.3 (34.3)	−1.9 (28.6)	4.4 (39.9)
Record low °C (°F)	−30.0 (−22.0)	−24.9 (−12.8)	−20.3 (−4.5)	−9.8 (14.4)	−5.3 (22.5)	−1.6 (29.1)	1.7 (35.1)	1.2 (34.2)	−4.0 (24.8)	−9.6 (14.7)	−13.1 (8.4)	−20.4 (−4.7)	−30.0 (−22.0)
Average precipitation mm (inches)	39.4 (1.55)	29.0 (1.14)	39.5 (1.56)	27.7 (1.09)	57.1 (2.25)	56.0 (2.20)	72.6 (2.86)	65.5 (2.58)	49.2 (1.94)	38.5 (1.52)	35.1 (1.38)	40.4 (1.59)	549.9 (21.65)
Average extreme snow depth cm (inches)	4.7 (1.9)	4.8 (1.9)	2.9 (1.1)	0.7 (0.3)	0.0 (0.0)	0.0 (0.0)	0.0 (0.0)	0.0 (0.0)	0.0 (0.0)	0.1 (0.0)	1.4 (0.6)	4.1 (1.6)	4.8 (1.9)
Average precipitation days (≥ 0.1 mm)	19.00	15.17	14.50	11.67	13.47	13.50	13.87	13.57	12.77	15.00	17.20	18.93	178.63
Average snowy days (≥ 0 cm)	13.1	11.7	5.0	0.4	0.0	0.0	0.0	0.0	0.0	0.0	2.8	7.5	40.5
Average relative humidity (%)	88.8	84.7	77.9	68.4	68.2	69.0	70.1	72.5	79.5	84.9	90.9	90.7	78.8
Mean monthly sunshine hours	45.1	68.8	127.7	205.0	255.7	252.4	259.2	240.2	164.6	108.0	46.0	32.7	1,805.4
Source 1: Institute of Meteorology and Water Management
Source 2: Meteomodel.pl (records, relative humidity 1991–2020)

== Economy ==
=== Major corporations ===
- Signify formerly known as 'Philips Lighting Poland", Piła
- Quad/Graphics Europe, Piła (in the past known as Winkowski sp. z o.o.)

== Attractions ==
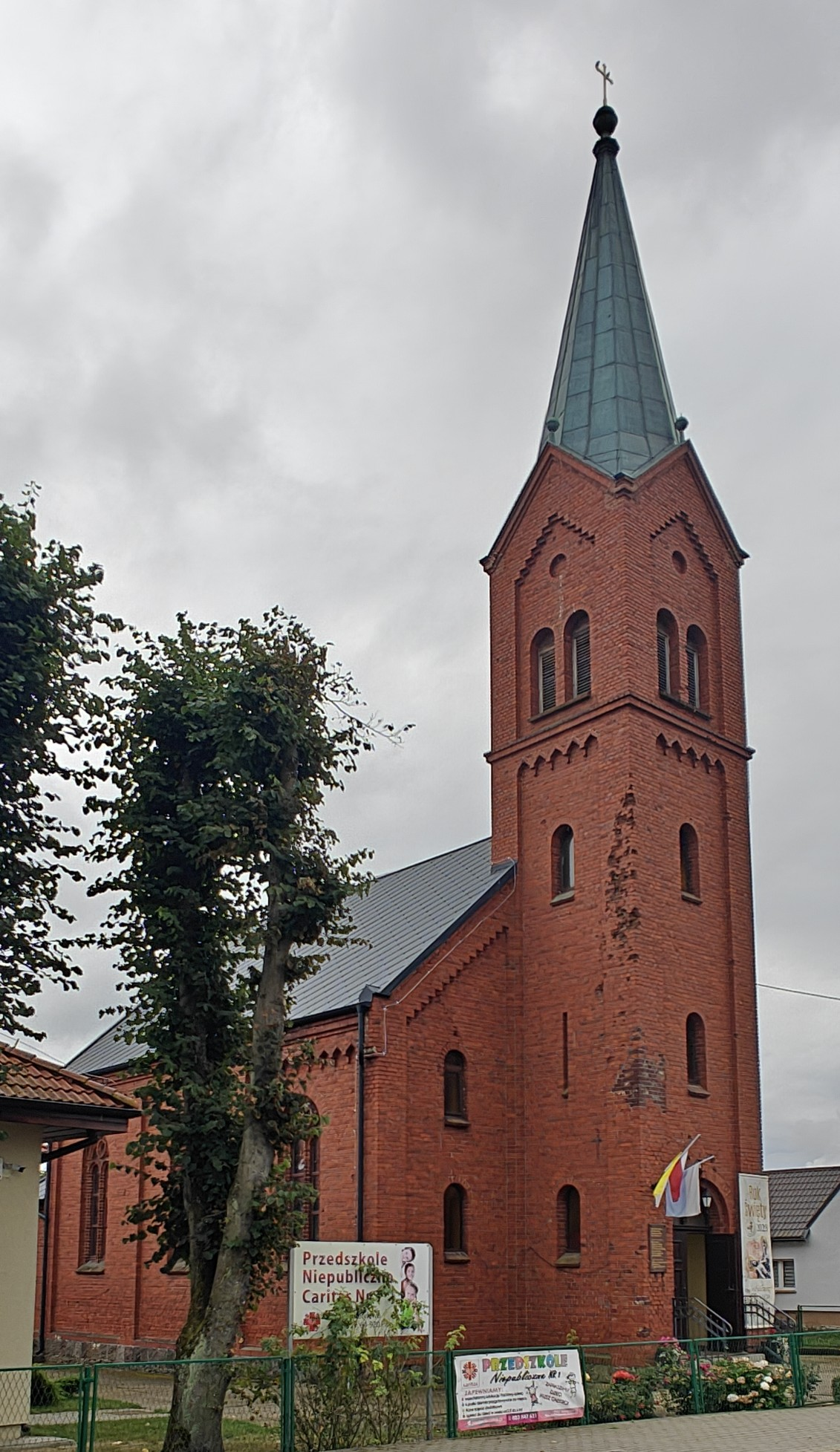
Our Lady of Częstochowa church

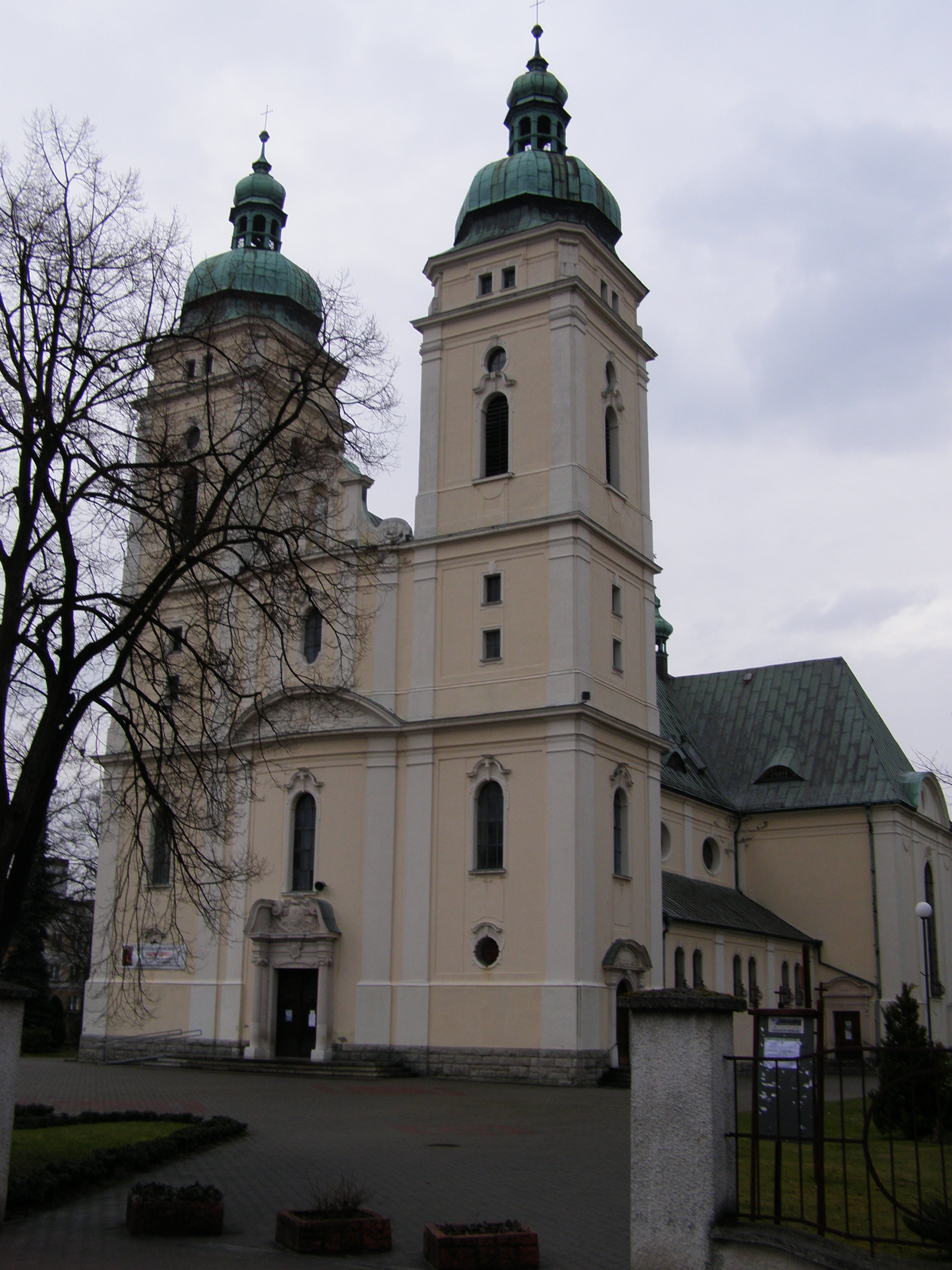
Holy Family church

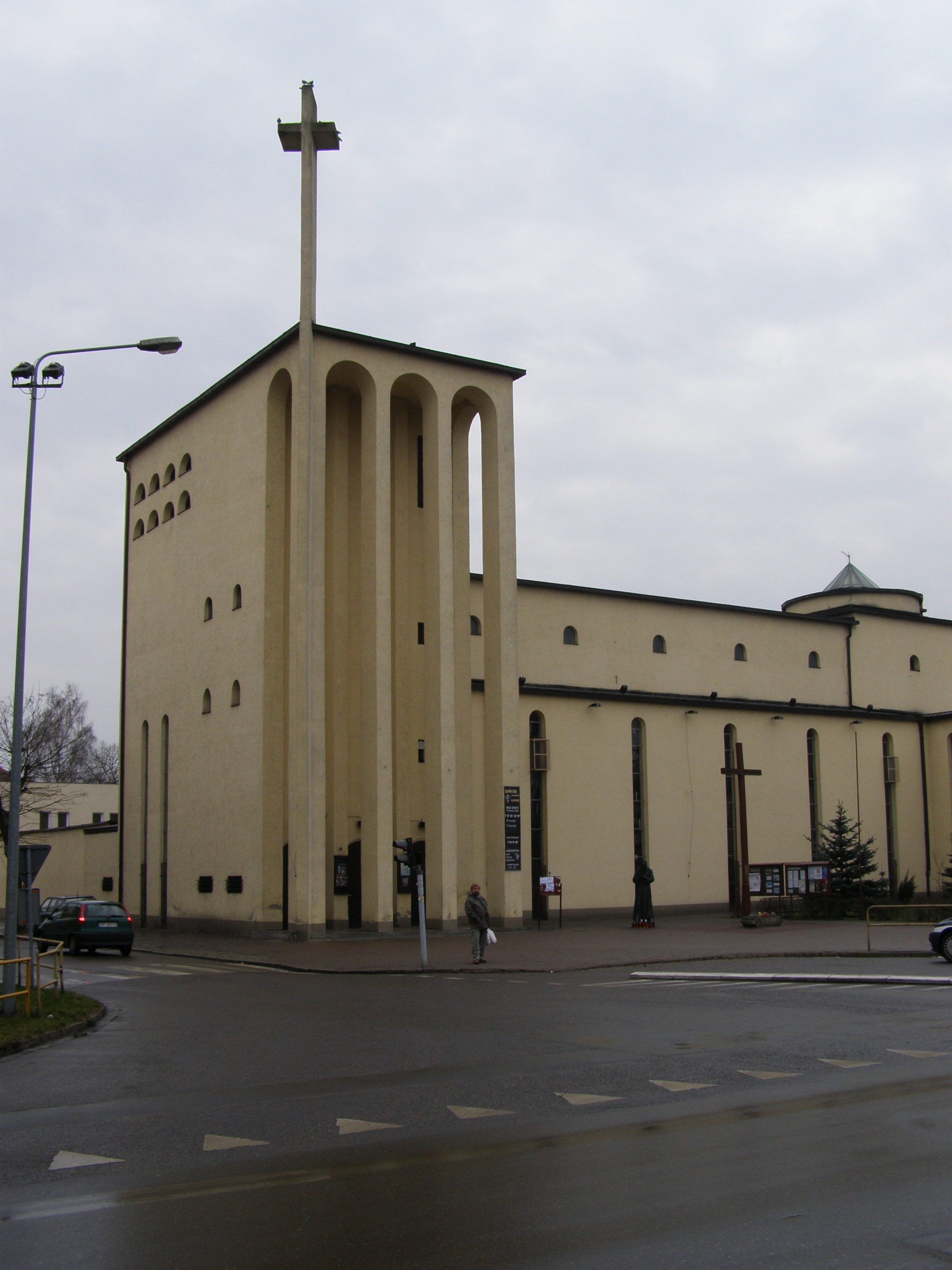
Saint Anthony church

- Museum of Stanisław Staszic in his former house
- 19th-century building of the former arsenal
- St. Stanislaus Kostka's church, built in Neo-Gothic style
- Holy Family's church, built in Neo-baroque style, formerly concathedral of the Prałatura Pilska
- St. Anthony's Church with the biggest wooden figure of Jesus in Europe, seven metres (23 feet) tall (church built in 1930)
- Prisoner of war cemetery in Leszków, where more than 2,600 Allied POWs from World War I are buried, including British, French, Polish, Lithuanian, Latvian, Russian, Tatar, and Jewish.
- World War II cemetery, at which Polish and Soviet soldiers, plus civilian victims of local German forced labour camps, are buried.
- Modern two-level shopping center "Atrium Kasztanowa"
- Modern shopping center "Vivo!" (Piła), located next to railway station "Dworzec PKP - Piła Główna (en. Station PKP - Piła Main)
- "Aqua Park" - water park
- "Park na Wyspie" - big park located on island (wyspa) with open-air gym, playground, square and fountains

== Politics ==
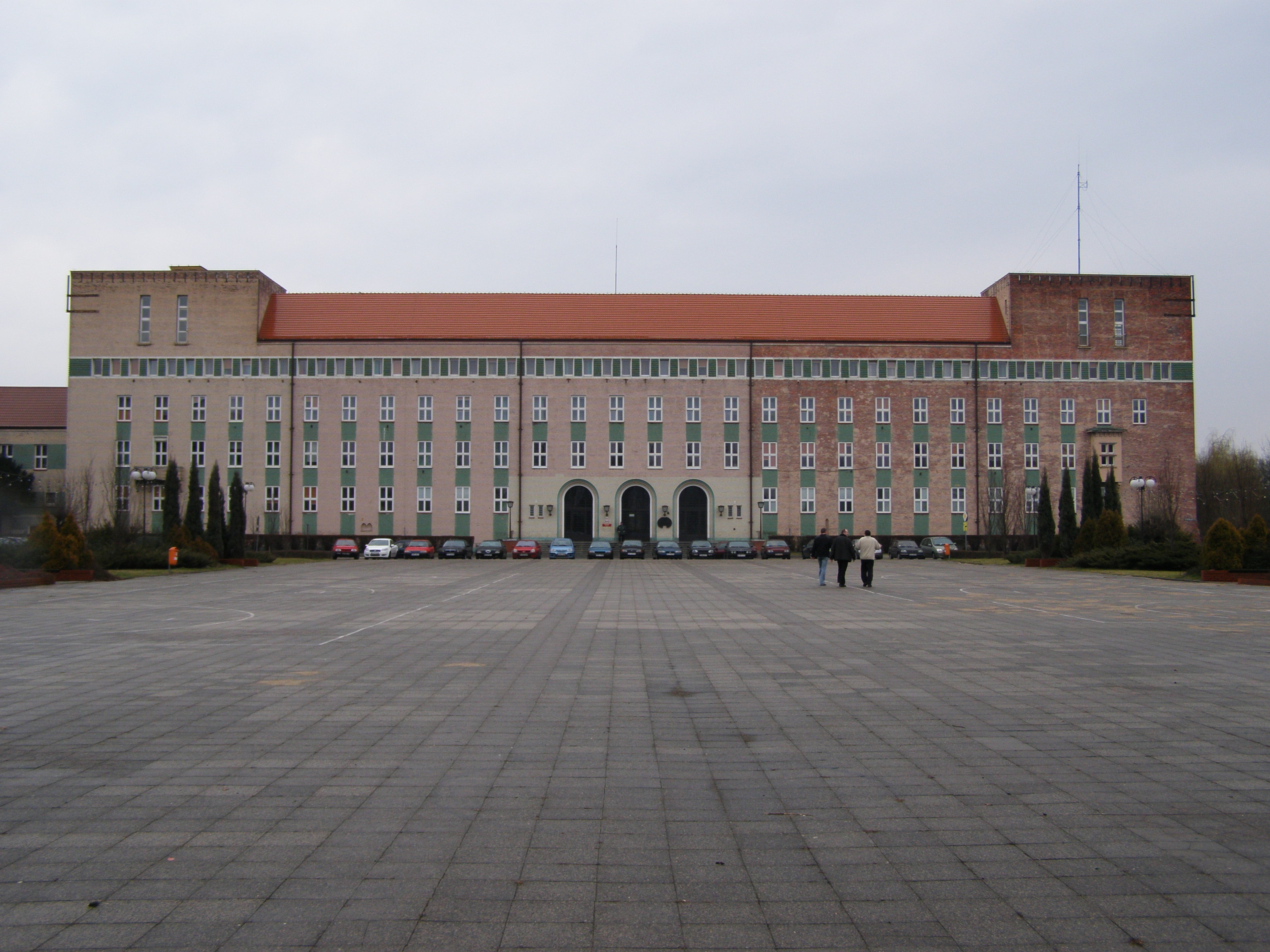
Police School in Piła

=== Piła constituency ===
Members of Parliament (Sejm) elected from Piła constituency:

- Adam Szejnfeld – Civic Platform
- Jakub Rutnicki – Civic Platform
- Stanisław Chmielewski – Civic Platform
- Piotr Waśko – Civic Platform
- Maks Kraczkowski – Law and Justice
- Tomasz Górski – Law and Justice
- Romuald Ajchler – Left and Democrats
- Stanisław Stec – Left and Democrats
- Stanisław Kalemba – Polish People's Party

Members of Polish Senate elected from Piła constituency:

- Mieczysław Augustyn – Civic Platform
- Piotr Głowski – Civic Platform

=== Municipal politics ===
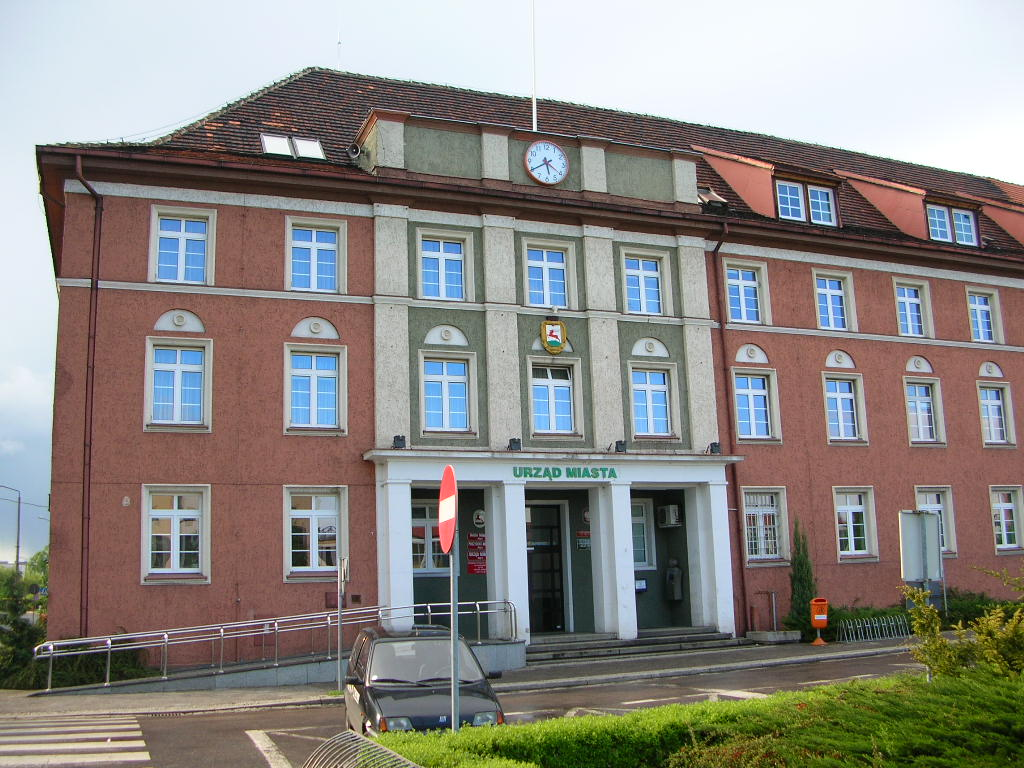
Town Hall

- The president of the Town of Piła: Piotr Głowski
- Vicepresidents: Krzysztof Szewc, Beata Dudzińska
- Town council chairman: Rafał Zdzierela
- Town council vicechairmans: Paweł Jarczak, Janusz Kubiak

== Sports ==
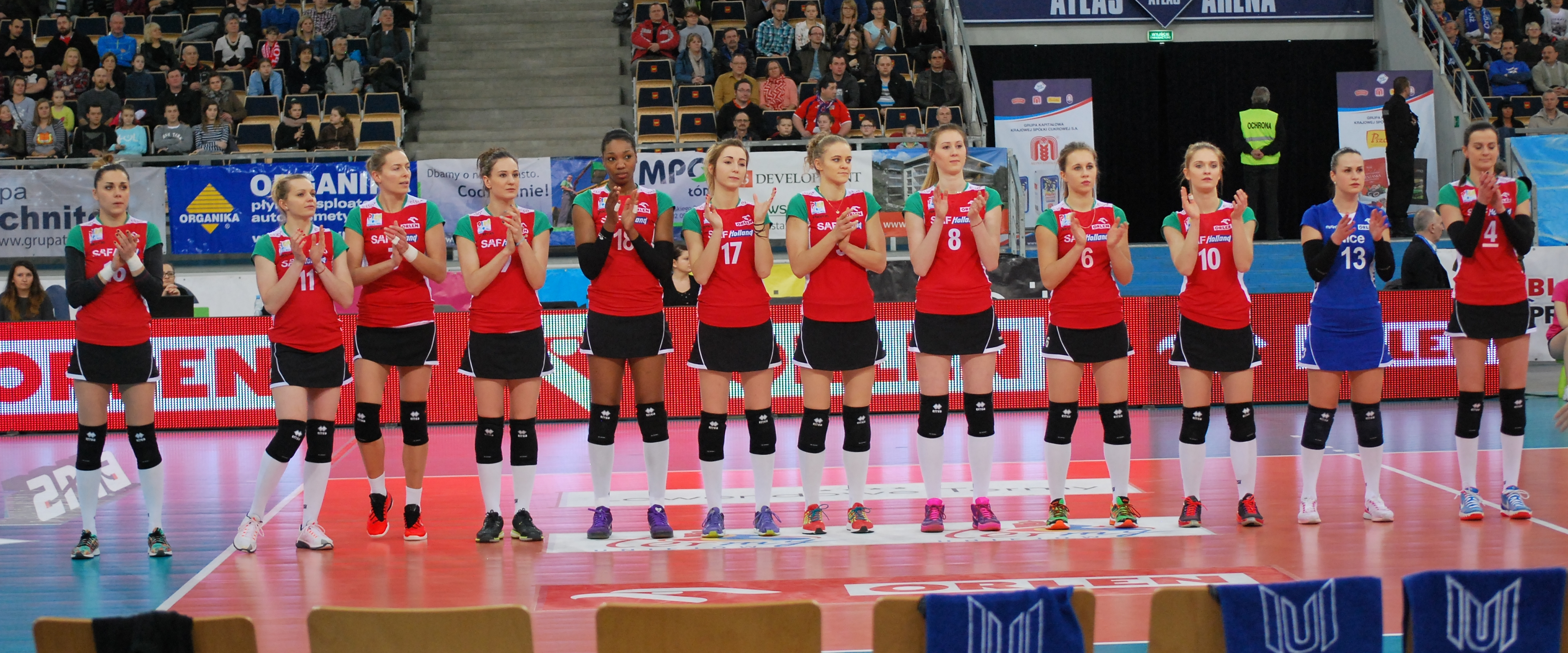
Players of PTPS Piła in the 2015–2016 seasons

- Polonia Piła – speedway team, 1999 Polish Champions
- PTPS Piła – women's volleyball team playing in the TAURON Liga (Polish top division): Polish champions in 1998–1999, 1999–2000, 2000–2001, 2001–2002 seasons, 2nd place in 2005–2006, 2006–2007 and 2007–2008 seasons and 3rd place in 2004–2005 and 2008–2009 seasons.
- Joker Piła – men's volleyball team playing in the lower leagues, which also played in the top division in the past (most recently in season 2005–06)
- Basket Piła – men's basketball team playing in the lower leagues
- Gwda Piła – athletics club
- Gwardia Piła – athletics club

Piła hosted the 2024 European U23 Judo Championships.

== Notable people ==
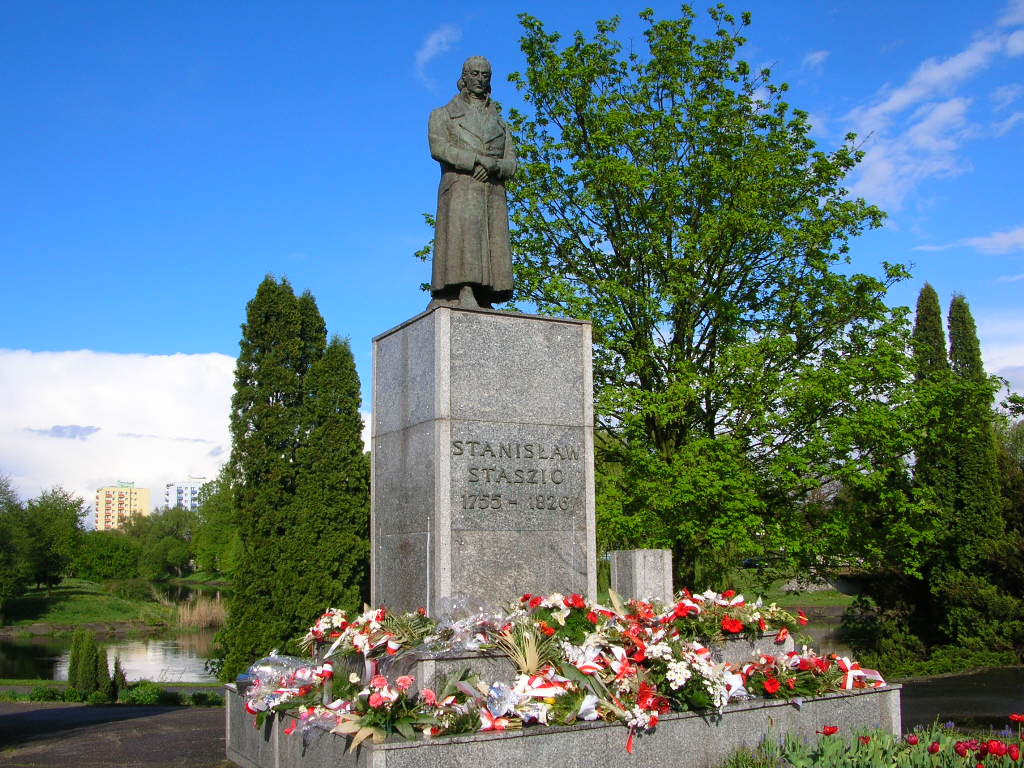
Stanisław Staszic monument in Piła

- Wolfgang Altenburg (1928–2023), former Chief of Staff, Bundeswehr
- Dirk Galuba (born 1940), German actor
- Carl Friedrich Goerdeler (1884–1945), German politician and anti-Nazi
- Fritz Goerdeler (1886–1945), German jurist and resistance fighter
- Andrzej Gronowicz (born 1951), Polish athlete
- Jerzy Stanisław Janicki (born 1956), physicist
- Maximilian Kaller (1880–1947), first Roman Catholic church administrator of the town
- Hein Kötz (born 1935), German jurist
- Erwin Kramer (1902–1979), German politician
- Ben Mendelsohn (born 1969), Australian actor whose ancestors lived in Piła
- Jo Mihaly (born Elfriede Alice Kuhr) (1902–1989), German dancer and writer
- Daria Pająk (born 1993), Polish bowling player
- Karl Retzlaw (1896–1979), German politician
- Eberhard Schenk (1929–2010), German athlete
- Bernard Schultze (1915–2005), German painter
- Kasia Smutniak (born 1979), Polish actress
- Stanisław Staszic (1755–1826), philosopher, leading figure in Polish Enlightenment.
- Wolfgang Thonke (1938–2019), East German general
- Johanna Töpfer (1929–1990), German politician

== International relations ==
=== Twin towns — Sister cities ===
Piła is twinned with:

- Châtellerault, France
- Schwerin, Germany
- Imola, Italy

=== Former twin towns ===
- Kronstadt, Russia

On 1 March 2022, Piła suspended its partnership with the Russian city of Kronsdadt as a reaction to the Russian invasion of Ukraine.

== See also ==
- Prisoner of war cemetery
