= Eberhard Schenk =

German track and field athlete

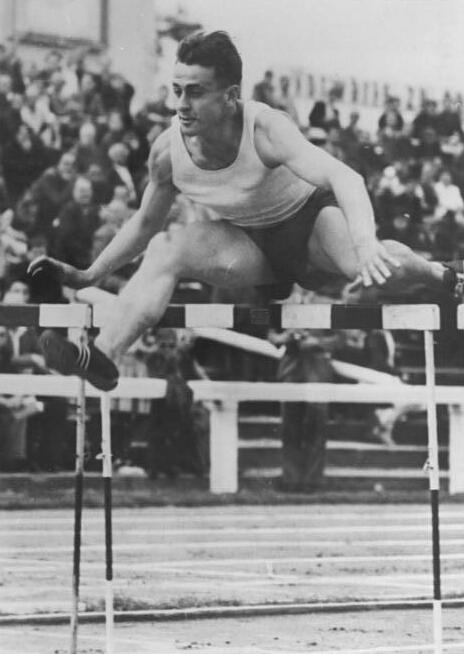
Eberhard Schenk in 1954

Eberhard Schenk (17 July 1929 – 23 July 2010) was a German Track and field athlete.

Schenk was born in Schneidemühl (Posen-West Prussia) (today Piła, Poland) and became a successful East German athlete of the 1950s. He was twice the East German hurdle race champion (1954: 200 meter; 1955: 110 meter).

Schenk started for Einheit Rostock, later SC Empor Rostock. After his career as an athlete he became a practising doctor at Bergen auf Rügen. He died in Bergen auf Rügen, Germany.

He was the father of Christian Schenk.

== Personal Best ==
- 100 Meter: 11.0 sec
- 200 Meter: 22.8 sec
- 400 Meter: 52.8 sec
- 110 Meter hurdles: 14.8 sec
- 200 Meter hurdles: 24.7 sec
- 400 Meter hurdles: 55.8 sec
- Long jump: 6.24 m
- Triple jump: 13.95 m
