= Prisoner of war cemetery, Piła =

Prisoner of war cemetery in Piła, Poland

Prisoner of war cemetery
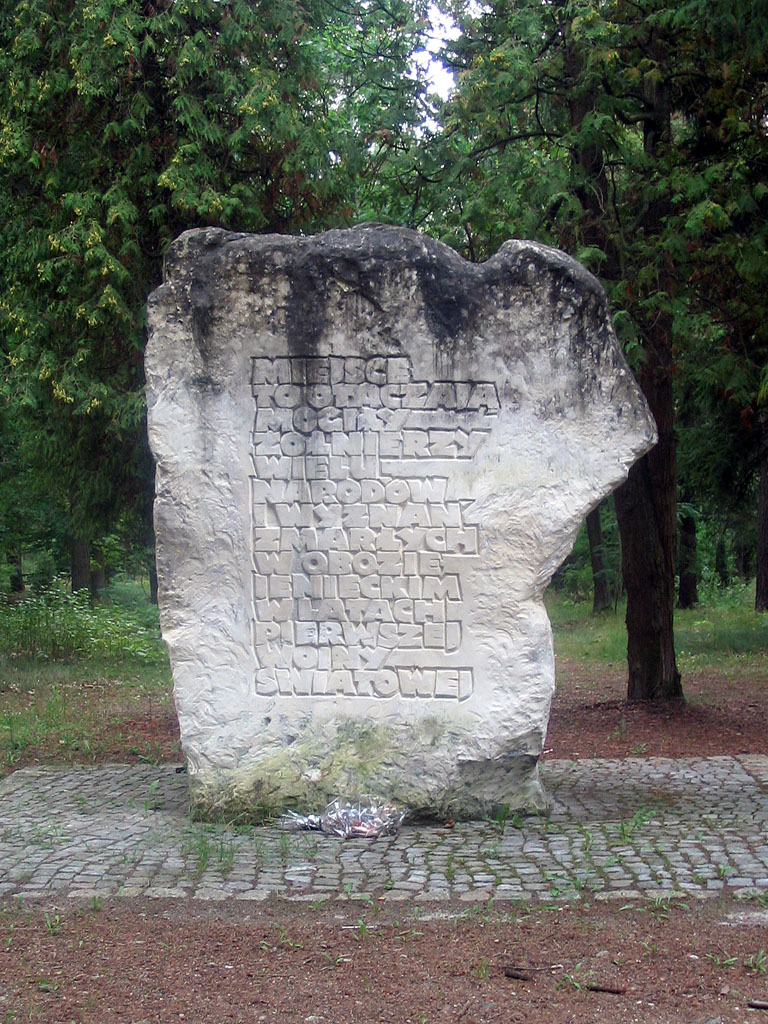
- Central monument
- Interactive map of Prisoner of war cemetery

Details
- Location: Piła
- Country: Poland
- Coordinates: 53°7′46.8768″N 16°47′45.222″E
- Type: Military
- Size: 2.07 ha (5.1 acres)

The Prisoner of war cemetery in Piła is the burial place of over 2,600 prisoners of war from the armies of the Triple Entente during World War I, who died in the German prisoner of war camp in Piła. It is located in Leszków, a southeastern suburb of Piła, on Na Leszkowie Street.

== History ==
=== Establishment of the cemetery ===
Following the defeat of the Russians in the Battle of Tannenberg and the collapse of the Russian offensive in East Prussia, German military authorities established a large prisoner-of-war camp in Piła for prisoners of war from the Russian army at the end of August 1914. Later, prisoners from the armies of other Entente states – British, French, and Belgian – were also sent there. The camp could hold about 45,000 prisoners at a time. It was located on the eastern outskirts of the city, on the former infantry exercise ground. This area, now at the end of Bydgoska Street, was recently used as a training ground by the Higher Officers' Automotive School. Due to harsh living conditions, prisoners died in large numbers, and infectious diseases spread, including cholera, typhoid fever, and dysentery. In 1915, military authorities established a large cemetery near the camp for the deceased prisoners. It was located several kilometers south of the camp, in the area of the Plöttke settlement (present-day Leszków), next to a small Evangelical cemetery. The entire area was cleared, fenced, and appropriately harmonized with the surrounding forest. Until the camp's closure in November 1918, over 2,600 people were buried there. The cemetery holds representatives of many nations (including Britons, French, Belgians, Russians, Poles, Lithuanians, Latvians, Jews, Tatars) and faiths (Anglicans, Roman Catholics, Muslims, Jews, Orthodox, Greek Catholics, Protestants). The majority were soldiers of the Russian army, which is why before World War II the necropolis was known as Russen Friedhof.

=== Interwar period and World War II ===
During the interwar period, under the provisions of Articles 225 and 226 of Part VI of the Treaty of Versailles of 28 June 1919, which obligated German authorities to care for prisoners' graves, the necropolis remained under the supervision of appropriate state services. During this time, the remains of some French and British soldiers were exhumed and transferred to their homelands. Funds from those countries were also received for grave maintenance, but due to the complete lack of interest from the Soviet authorities in the graves of Russian prisoners, the city of Piła had to allocate 4,000 German marks annually to maintain the three Piła prisoner-of-war cemeteries. After 1934, Nazis desecrated the Jewish section. Gravestones from there were used, among other things, to reinforce the banks of the Gwda river near Leszków. The cemetery survived the fighting for the city in January and February 1945 in good condition.

=== Postwar period ===
Between 1949 and 1953, a cemetery for Soviet and Polish soldiers who fell in the fighting for Piła was established nearby. The prisoner-of-war cemetery itself gradually fell into disrepair, accelerated by the dismantling of the fence and entrance gate. The chapel and some monuments were demolished, and many tombstones were destroyed or looted. In 1983, the cemetery was entered into the register of monuments and partially restored in subsequent years; among other things, two new monuments were erected and existing ones were renovated, alleys were paved, and some tombstones were reconstructed. However, acts of vandalism also occurred in later periods: destruction of gravestones and theft of metal elements from monument fences at the beginning of the 21st century.

== Tombstones ==
In the early period of the cemetery's existence, wooden crosses with enameled plaques were placed on the prisoners' graves. Currently, most tombstones take the form of simple Latin crosses made of concrete, mass-produced in just a few versions. All bear a serial number (formerly the last grave bore no. 2967). Some crosses also bear the deceased's name and surname in the Latin or Cyrillic alphabet, as well as the date of death; however, there are also many unnamed crosses with only the serial number. Only a dozen or so preserved officers' graves, mostly Russian, are more elaborate, resembling civilian tombstones. Muslim and Jewish tombstones have a different form. The former (19 preserved) are steles of gray sandstone arched at the top. In the upper part of each stele is a crescent and star (symbol of Islam), below the beginning of a quote from the Quran, as well as the prisoner's surname and year of death in Cyrillic. Jewish gravestones (three preserved, including one of a different type) are stylized as tablets of the Ten Commandments, with inscriptions in Hebrew and topped with a Star of David. However, none of the tombstones of French and Belgian soldiers, made of black marble, have survived.

== Gallery ==
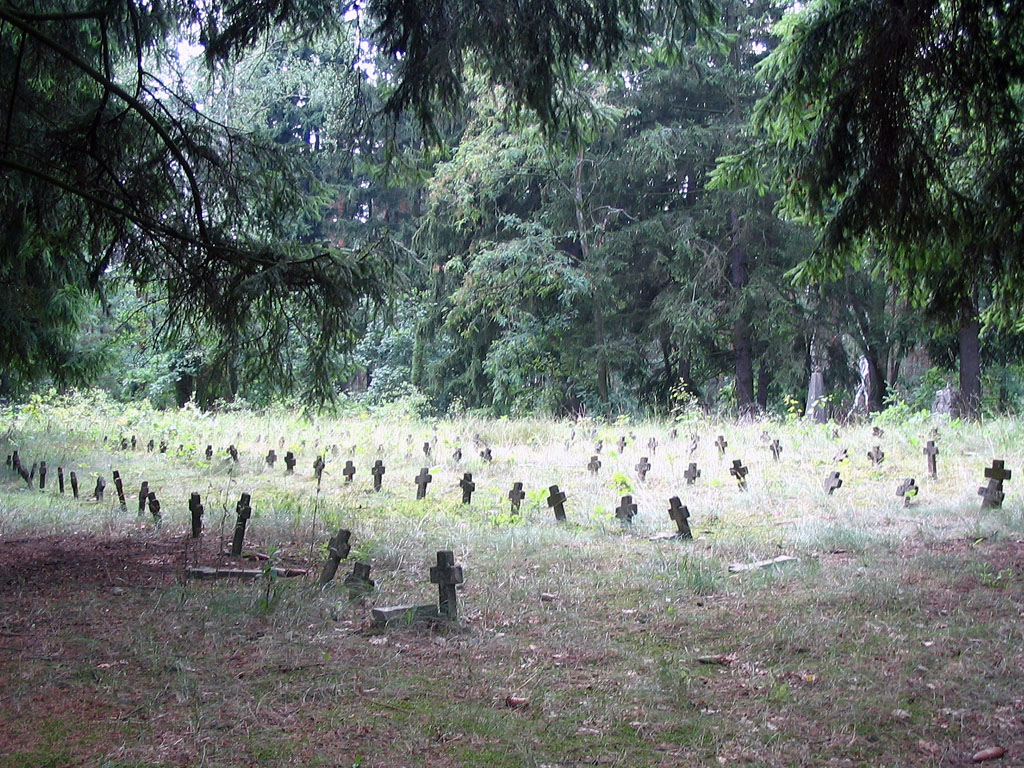
British section

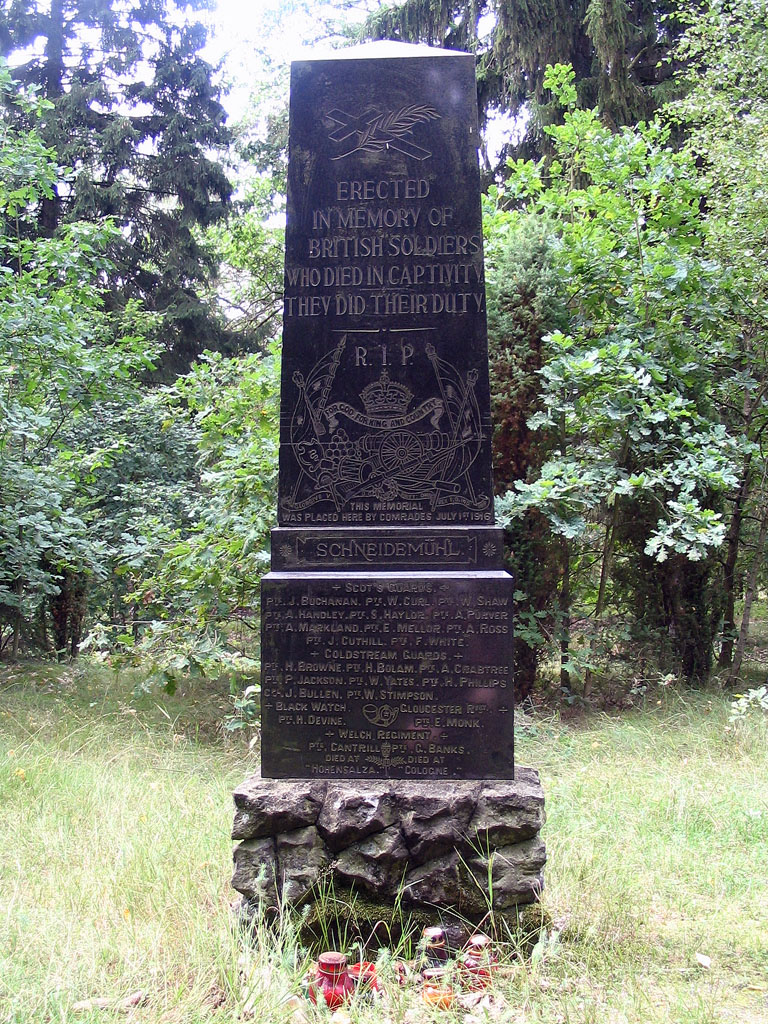
Monument to British soldiers

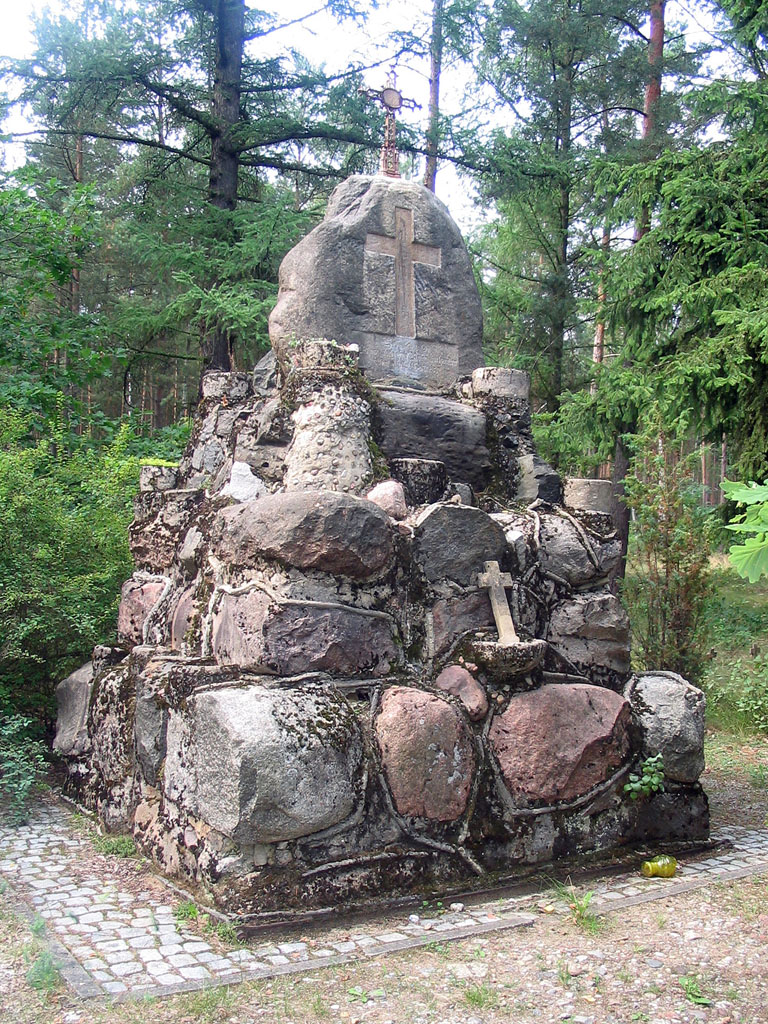
Monument to prisoners of German origin

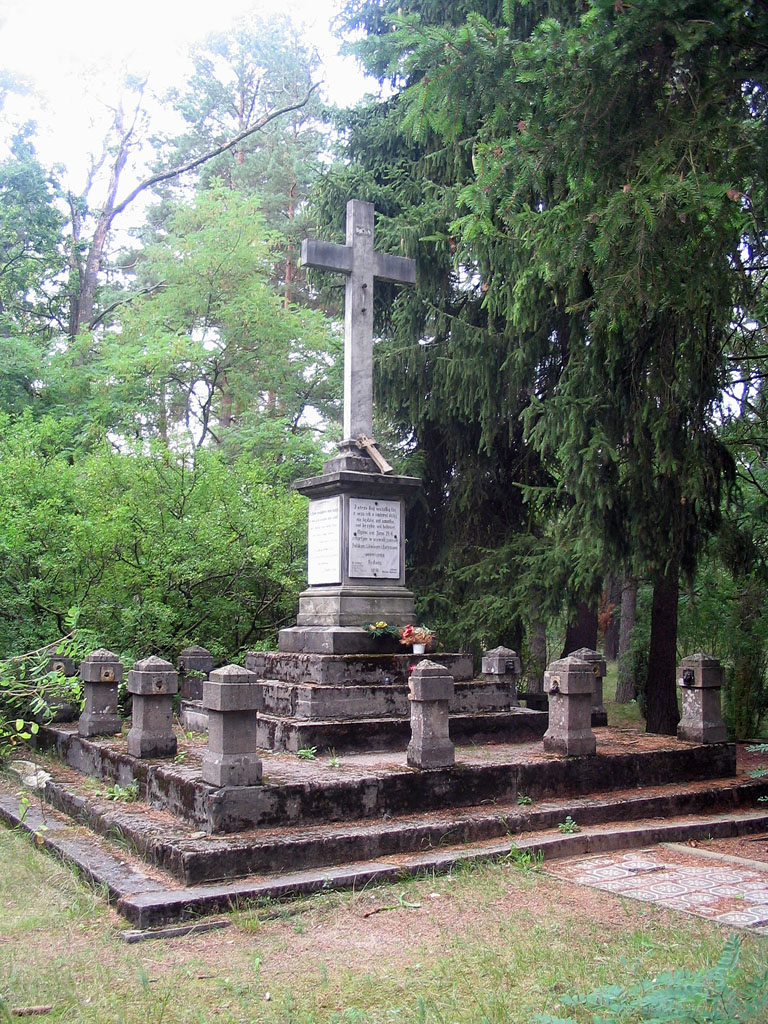
Monument to soldiers of Polish, Lithuanian, and Latvian nationality

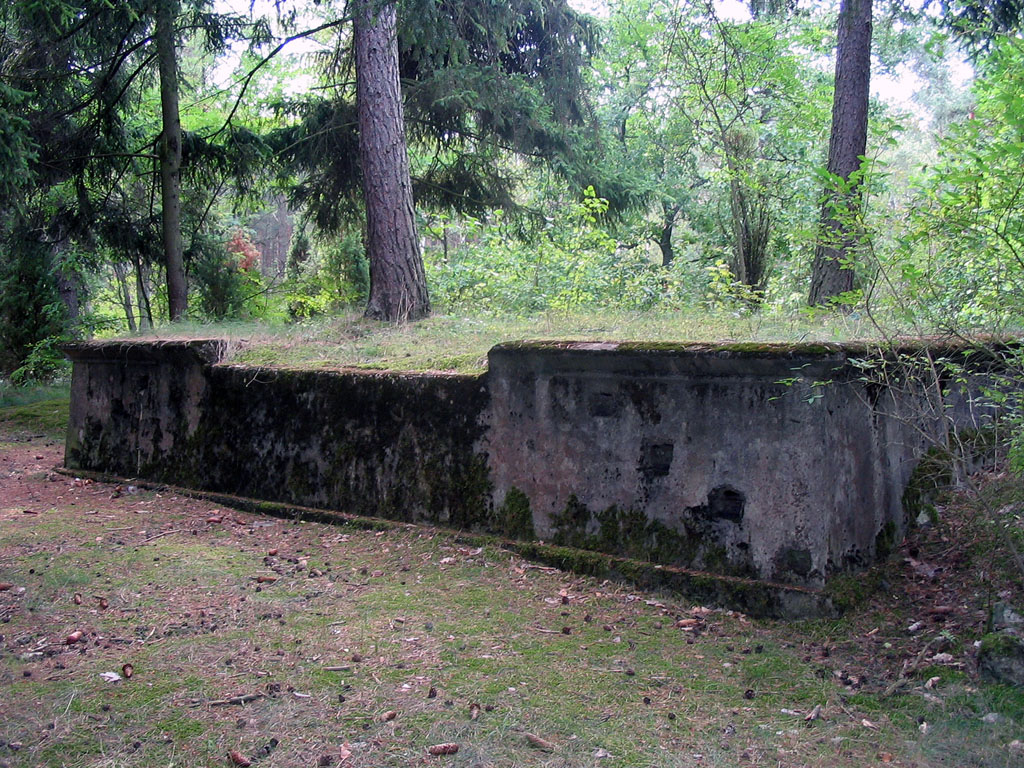
Alleged remnants of the chapel

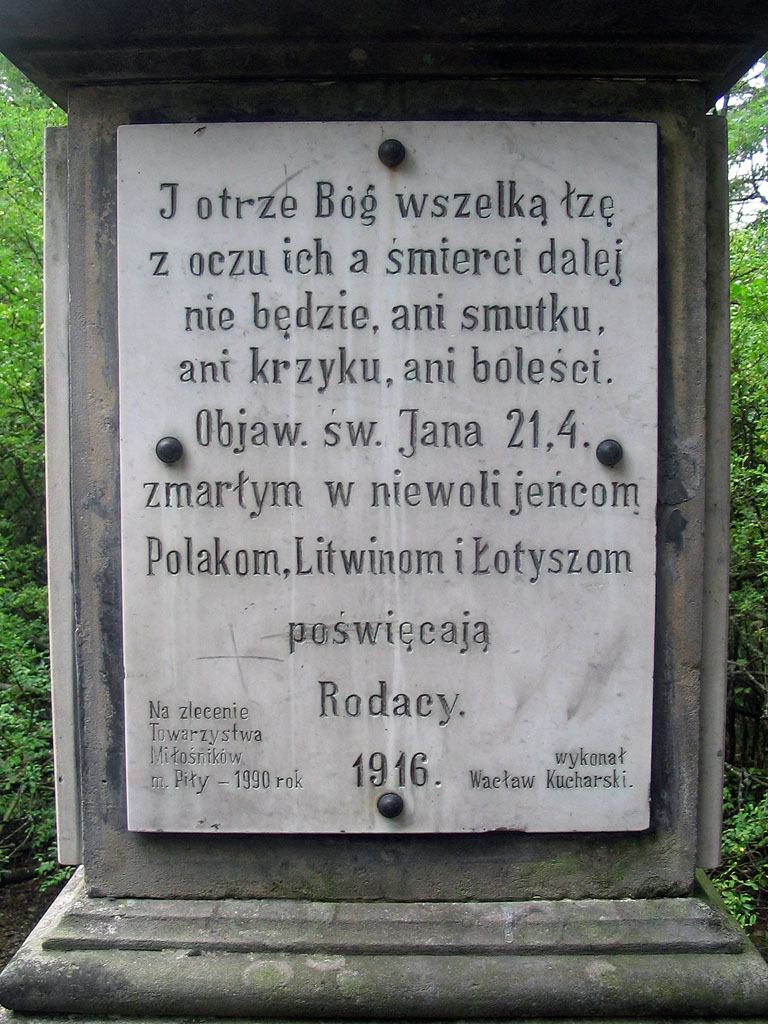
Plaque on one of the monuments

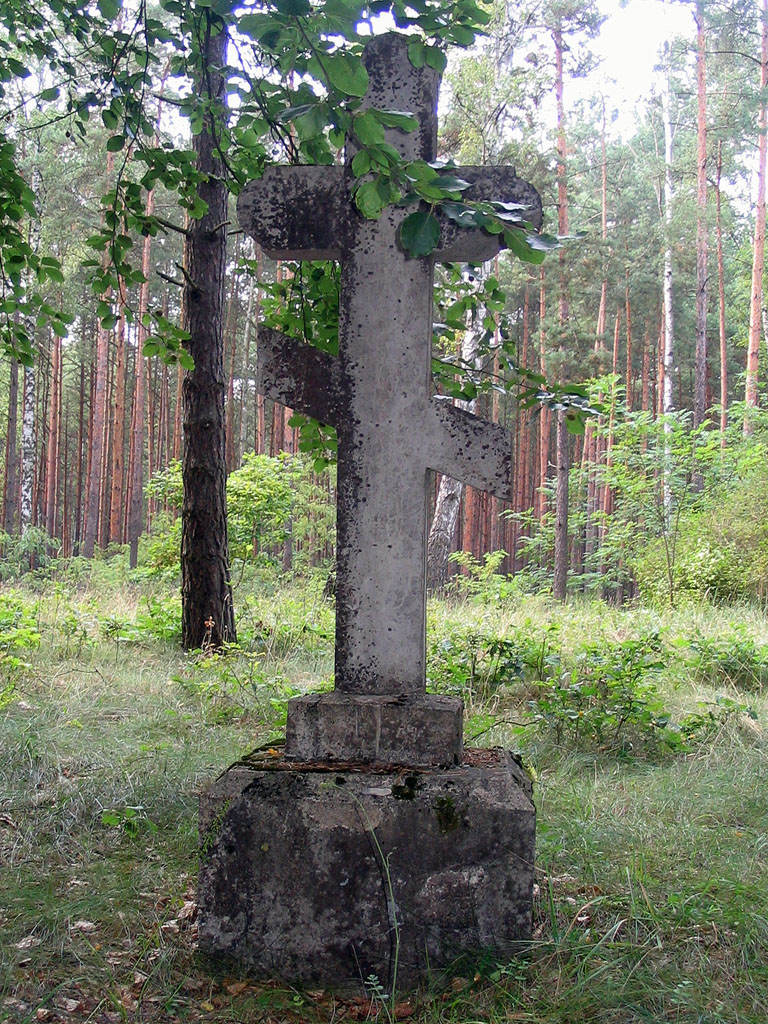
Orthodox cross

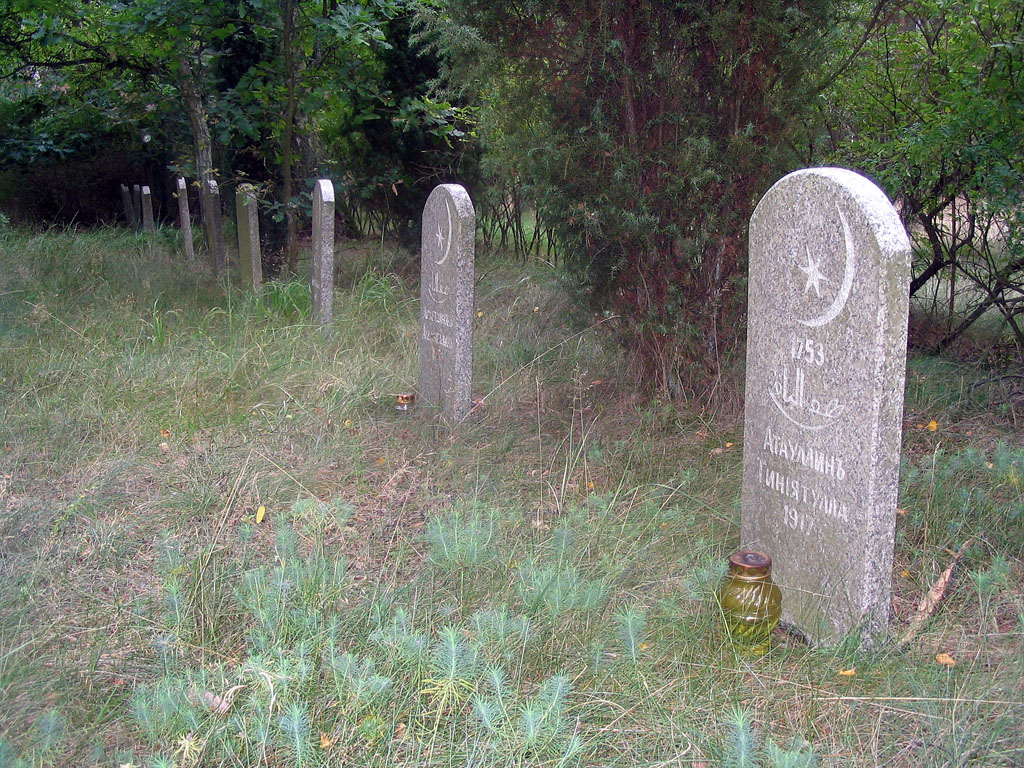
Muslim section

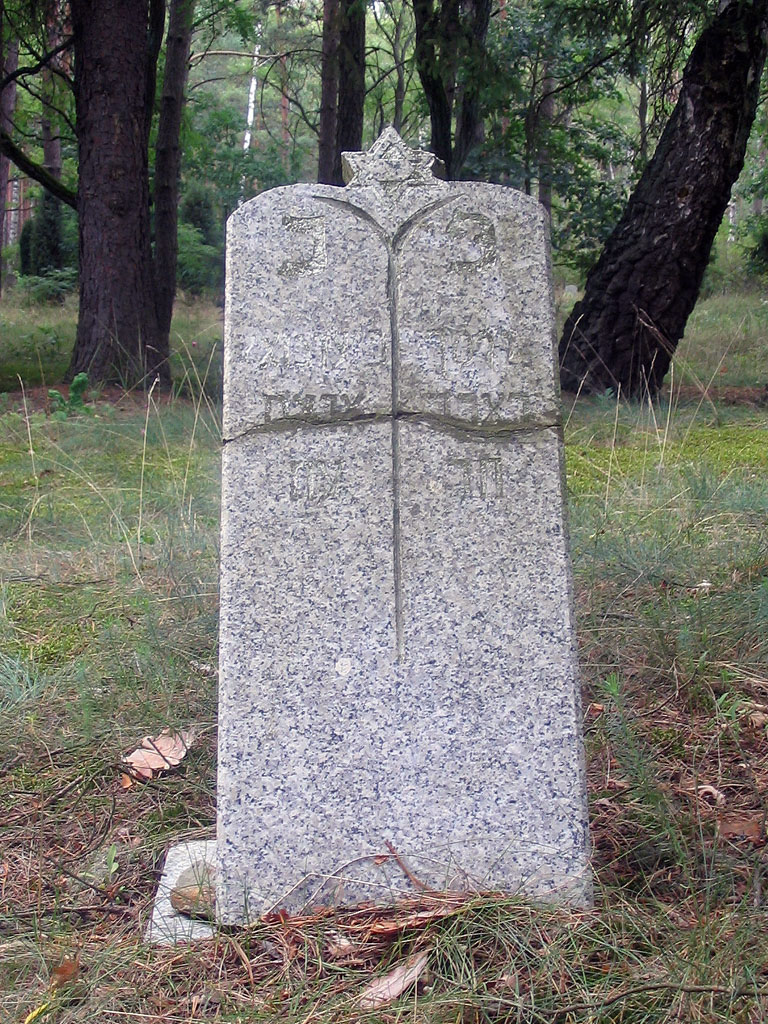
Jewish gravestone

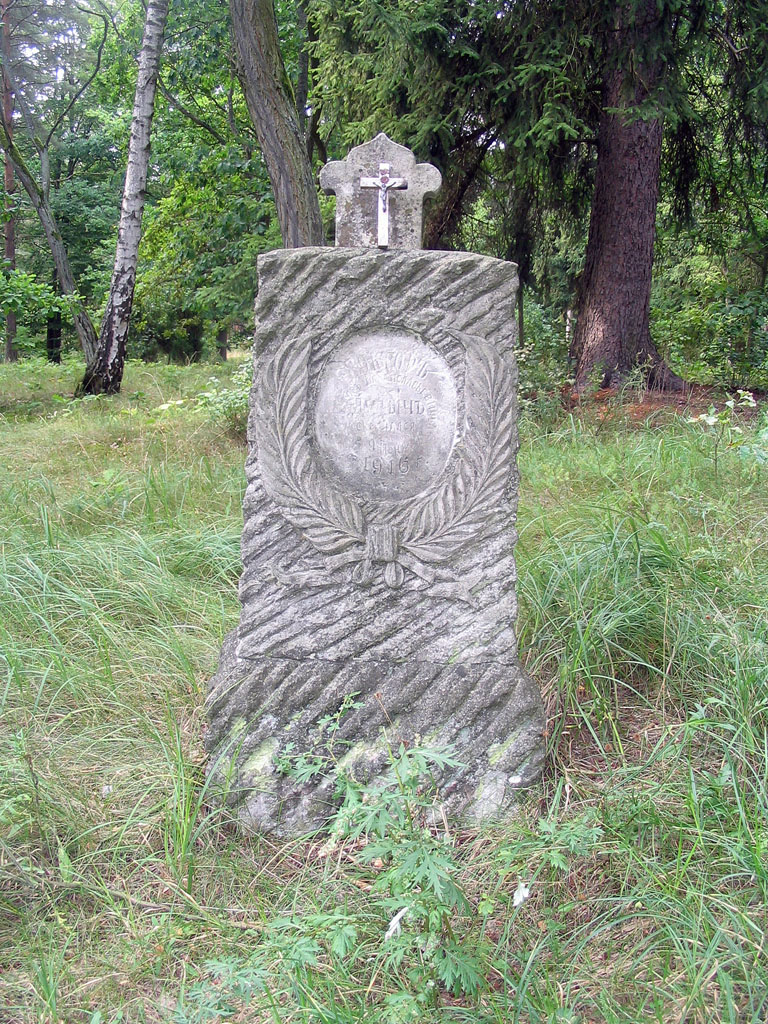
Tombstone of a Russian officer

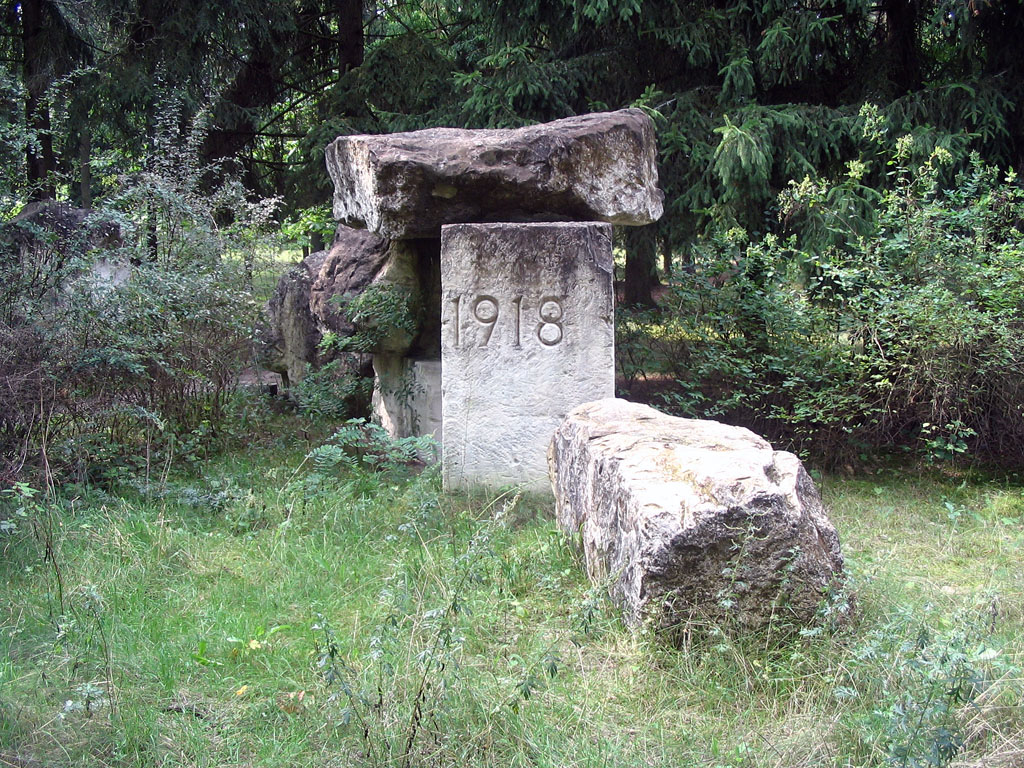
Monument at the cemetery entrance

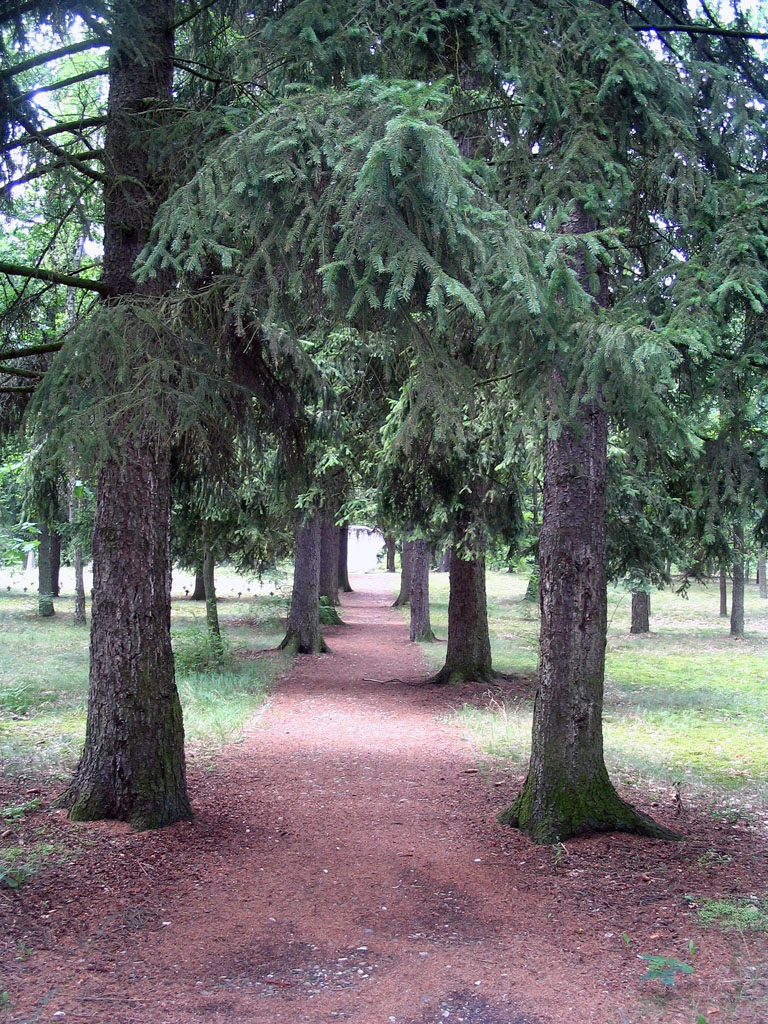
Main alley
