= Coat of arms of Piła =

Coat of arms of Piła

The coat of arms of the Polish city of Piła features a red (or sometimes brown) deer on a green field, leaping to the dexter. It was first featured on a seal of the city council created probably in 1571. Initially, the deer was leaping towards the sinister side of the shield; this was changed in the 17th century. During the Partitions of Poland, the local German authorities sometimes also used a modification of the coat of arms featuring a crowned deer.

The modern version of the coat of arms was adopted by the city council of Piła in 1990. The colours used in the arms are also used on the flag of Piła.
