= Beata Dudzińska =

Beata Dudzińska may refer to:

- Beata Kamuda-Dudzińska (1960–2024), Polish rower
- Beata Andrejczuk-Dudzińska (1988–2026), Polish chess player
