= Men's EuroHockey5s Championship =

- Most recent season or competition: 2026 Men's EuroHockey5s Championship
- Sport: Hockey5s
- Founded: 2022; 4 years ago
- First season: 2022
- No. of teams: 5
- Confederation: EHF (Europe)
- Most recent champion: Ukraine (2026)
- Most titles: Netherlands; Poland; Ukraine (1 Title)

The Men's EuroHockey5s Championship (also known as Men's EuroHockey5s World Cup Qualifier) is a men's international Hockey5's tournament organized by the European Hockey Federation. The event is played in Hockey 5s format, a 5-a-side game that is played on a smaller field size. The winning team becomes the European Champions and qualifies for the FIH Hockey5s World Cup.

The first three editions took place in Wałcz, won by three different teams, Netherlands, Poland and Ukraine. The top 3 teams from the inaugural tournament qualified for the first ever Hockey5s World Cup in 2024.

== Results ==
Year	Host	Final			Third place match			Number of teams
Year	Host	Winner	Score	Runner-up	Third place	Score	Fourth place	Number of teams
2022; Details	Walcz, Poland	Netherlands	4–1	Belgium	Poland	8–2	Switzerland	13
2024; Details	Walcz, Poland	Poland	3–2	Ukraine	Switzerland	2–2 (3–2 p.s.o.)	Italy	10
2026; Details	Walcz, Poland	Ukraine	Round-robin	Poland	Sweden	Round-robin	Slovakia	5

== Successful national teams ==
Teams reaching the top four
Team	Champions	Runners-up	Third place	Fourth place
Poland	1 (2024*)	1 (2026*)	1 (2022*)	
Ukraine	1 (2026)	1 (2024)		
Netherlands	1 (2022)			
Belgium		1 (2022)		
Switzerland			1 (2024)	1 (2022)
Sweden			1 (2026)	
Italy				1 (2024)
Slovakia				1 (2026)

* = host country

=== Team appearances ===
Team	(Poland) 2022	(Poland) 2024	(Poland) 2026	Total
Armenia	13th	–	–	1
Austria	5th	–	–	1
Belgium	2nd	–	–	1
Bulgaria	–	–	5th	1
Croatia	8th	–	–	1
Cyprus	9th	10th	–	2
Czechia	–	5th	–	1
Finland	10th	9th	–	2
Italy	–	4th	–	1
Lithuania	–	7th	–	1
Luxembourg	11th	–	–	1
Netherlands	1st	–	–	1
Poland	3rd	1st	2nd	3
Slovakia	–	–	4th	1
Sweden	12th	8th	3rd	3
Switzerland	4th	3rd	–	2
Turkey	7th	6th	–	2
Ukraine	6th	2nd	1st	3
Total (18)	13	10	5	

=== Debut of teams ===
Year	Debutants	Total
2022	Armenia, Austria, Belgium, Croatia, Cyprus, Finland, Luxembourg, Netherlands, Poland, Sweden, Switzerland, Turkey, Ukraine	13
2024	Czechia, Italy, Lithuania	3
2026	Bulgaria, Slovakia	2
Total		18

== See also ==
- Women's EuroHockey5s Championship
