= Gotthart A. Eichhorn =

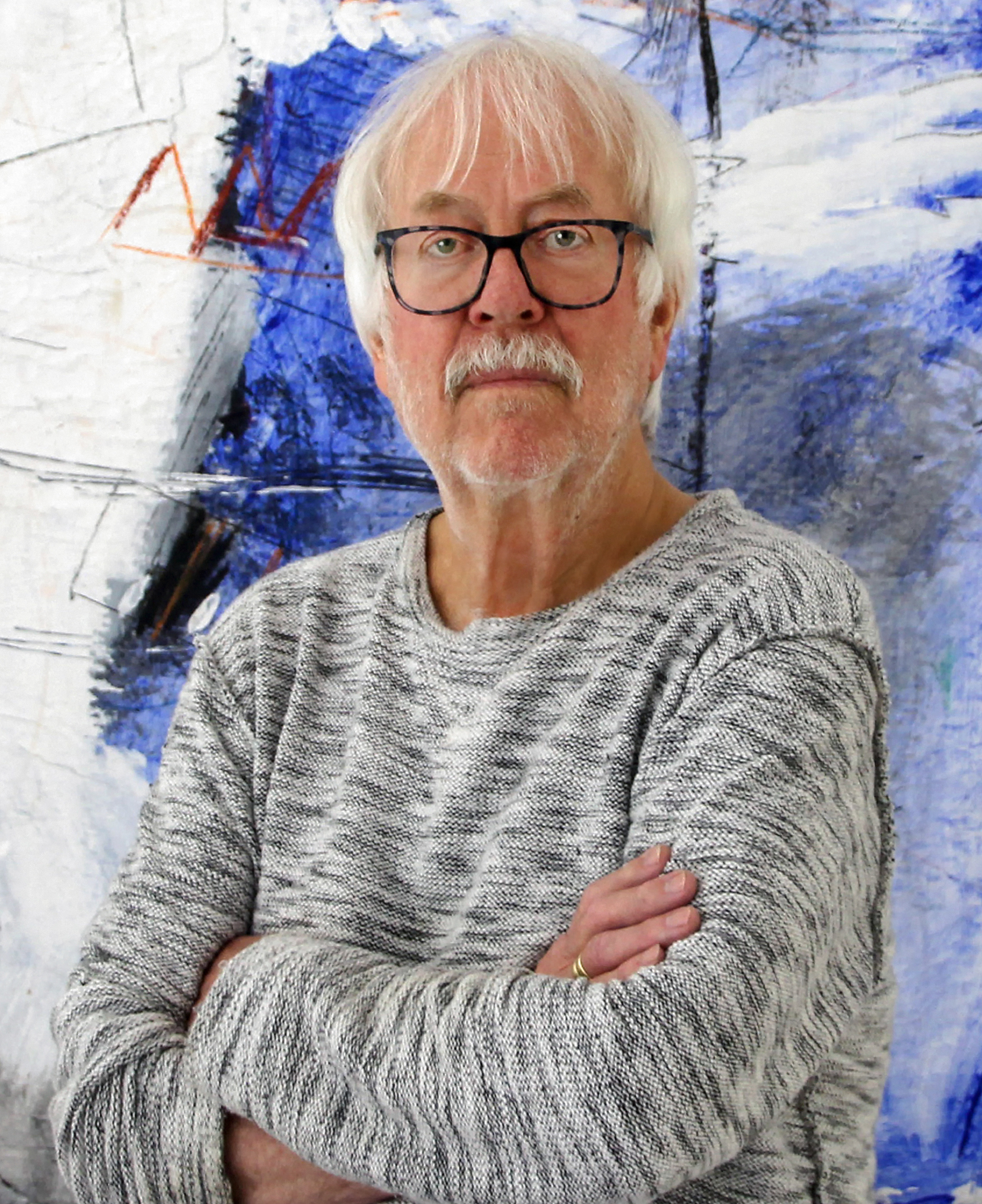
Gotthart A. Eichhorn, 2019

Gotthart A. Eichhorn (born 1941 in Görlitz) is a German photographer, photodesigner and author.

== Curriculum vitae ==
Gotthart A. Eichhorn was born in Görlitz as the youngest of five children and fled at the end of World War II in February 1945 with his mother and his 4 sisters to Idstein. One of his sisters is Godela Habel (* 18 September 1929 in Deutsch Krone, West Pomeranian), an abstract painter and artist, who won the Dr.-Theobald-Simon-Award of GEDOK in 1998. His father, a Baltic German refugee from Estonia, was an architect and university lecturer, who moved after being released from a prisoner of war camp with his family to Hagen (Westfalen). Eichhorn went there to school at Fichte-Gymnasium from 1951 to 1960.

After finishing his education, he began a voluntary internship as a journalist, but then he became an apprentice photographer. After completing his apprenticeship in Hagen und Frankfurt he was the leading photographer in a big studio at Braun AG in Kronberg. During this time he collaborated with the Ulm School of Design and won several prices and honors in Germany and abroad. He is selfemployed since 1971 and works as a photodesigner for international agencies and companies. He also produces well received audiovisual slide shows.

Stile, phantasy and perfection are the base for his photografic activities. He takes photographs of life, beauty, illusion and volatility and looks out for the unexpected. He succeeds in realising his photographic ideas through his sensitivity, his professional doubtlessness and his co-operative communication with clients, models and consumers. His talent, to give things of the day-to-day life their autonomous shape and to put them into perspective, guaranteed his success. The topic of his surreal photography was to tease out the untouchable especially during projects for Dresdner Bank, and this defined his unique recognition as an artiscally working commercial photographer.

After retreating himself from the City of Frankfurt to an historic timber frame building in rural Spessart, he began to work again also as an author, when he wrote his autobiographical story "Reise in mein frühes Ich – Journey to my earlier me". He describes the traumatic experiences after the War during his youth and offers dramatic snap shots of his life. A central topic is a very early love affaire. By his passionate move into the world of media of the 1960s he explored the photography as a means of expressing himself. Searching for clarity and beauty were his key objectives on this journey.

An important part of his work at his three studios in Kronberg, Eschborn and Frankfurt was to educate younger colleagues. With his camera assistants he engaged in teamwork, and some of them are now internationally recognised photo designers themselves, such as Michael Ehrhart, Hans-Jürgen Herrmann, Jürgen Lecher, Vanja Vukovic and Ernst Wrba.

== Family ==
He married the arts dealer, painter and illustrator Johanna K. Eichhorn, née Philipp (born 1945) in 1968. 1972 they got their daughter Anna Carina Eichhorn, who is chief executive officer of humatrix AG since 2012, of which she was a founding member in 2001. He lives with his wife in Geiselbach-Omersbach since 2006.

== Publications ==
- Gotthart A. Eichhorn: Reise in mein frühes Ich. Eine autobiografische Erzählung – Journey to my former me – An autobiographic story. AAVAA, 2012.
- New York Before Nine Eleven. YouTube Audiovision, 23 October 2020.
- Zukunft der Vergangenheit – ein Tatsachenroman. Tredition, Hamburg, 2020, ISBN 978-3347192843 (hardcover), ISBN 978-3347192836 (paper back) und ISBN 978-3-347192850 (e-Book)
- Between Huts and Temples - Scenes of the Bazaar at Luxor YouTube Audiovision, 12 January 2022.
