= 2022 Men's EuroHockey5s Championship =

Field hockey 5s tournament

Tournament details
- Host country: Poland
- City: Walcz
- Dates: 6–9 July
- Teams: 13 (from 1 confederation)
- Venue: Centralny Ośrodek

Final positions
- Champions: Netherlands (1st title)
- Runner-up: Belgium
- Third place: Poland

Tournament statistics
- Matches played: 47
- Goals scored: 664 (14.13 per match)
- Top scorer: (Austria) Fabian Unterkircher (26 goals)

The 2022 Men's EuroHockey5s Championship (also known as Men's EuroHockey5s World Cup Qualifier) is the first edition of the Men's EuroHockey5s Championship and also the first Euro Hockey5s World Cup Qualifier for the men's Hockey5s event at the FIH Hockey5s World Cup. It was held a year prior to the women's tournament in Walcz, Poland from 6 to 9 July 2022.

The winner, runner-up, and third-placed team of the tournament qualify for the 2024 Hockey5s World Cup.

== Teams ==
- Armenia
- Austria
- Belgium
- Croatia
- Cyprus
- Finland
- Luxembourg
- Netherlands
- Poland
- Sweden
- Switzerland
- Turkey
- Ukraine

== Preliminary round ==
=== Pool A ===
| Pos | Team | Pld | W | D | L | GF | GA | GD | Pts | Qualification |
|---|---|---|---|---|---|---|---|---|---|---|
| 1 | Belgium | 6 | 6 | 0 | 0 | 86 | 12 | +74 | 18 | Semi-Finals |
| 2 | Poland (H) | 6 | 5 | 0 | 1 | 94 | 16 | +78 | 15 | Semi-Finals |
| 3 | Ukraine | 6 | 4 | 0 | 2 | 79 | 22 | +57 | 12 | 5–8th place semi-finals |
| 4 | Croatia | 6 | 3 | 0 | 3 | 42 | 42 | 0 | 9 | 5–8th place semi-finals |
| 5 | Cyprus | 6 | 2 | 0 | 4 | 25 | 39 | −14 | 6 | 9/10th place game |
| 6 | Luxembourg | 6 | 1 | 0 | 5 | 25 | 59 | −34 | 3 | 11–13th place game |
| 7 | Armenia | 6 | 0 | 0 | 6 | 2 | 163 | −161 | 0 | 11–13th place game |

Source: FIH
Rules for classification: 1) points; 2) matches won; 3) goal difference; 4) goals for; 5) head-to-head result; 6) field goals for.
(H) Hosts

6 July 2022
10:00

| Luxembourg | 0–19 | Belgium |
|---|---|---|
| | Report | Biekens 1', 11', 17', 21', 28'; Duvekot 3', 4', 22', 24'; Esquelin 5', 9', 25'; Englebert 8' van Marcke 11'; Sidler 20', 26', 28', 29'; Donck 29' |

Umpires:
Nick Bennett (ENG)
Maarten Boxma (NED)

6 July 2022
10:30

| Armenia | 0–34 | Ukraine |
|---|---|---|
| | Report | Moroz 1', 6', 13', 16', 23'; Onofriiuk 2', 7', 25', 25', 26', 27', 29'; Kovalenko 4', 6', 22', 22', 23', 24', 27'; Luppa 5', 10'; Shevchuk 6', 11', 16', 23', 28', 29'; Zhemereniuk 8', 15', 22'; Kaplinskyi 9', 24', 29'; Solomianyi 12' |

Umpires:
Luka Zupancic (AUT)
Germain Boutte (BEL)

6 July 2022
11:30

| Cyprus | 2–8 | Croatia |
|---|---|---|
| Stylianou 20'; Nicandrou 25' | Report | Grgurev 3', 17', 28'; Ilinović 8'; Krleža 13', 21', 24', 28' |

Umpires:
Benjamin Messerli (SUI)

6 July 2022
14:00

| Luxembourg | 2–20 | Poland |
|---|---|---|
| Jagadeesh 16'; Sallerman 24' | Report | Koperski 1', 22'; Rutkowski 2', 16', 28'; Jarzynski 4', 10', 15', 19', 26', 26', 29'; Nowakowski 8', 19', 23'; Pawlak 13', 20', 30'; Kurowski 14', 21' |

Umpires:
Luka Zupancic (AUT)
Nick Bennett (ENG)

6 July 2022
17:00

| Armenia | 0–41 | Belgium |
|---|---|---|
| | Report | Biekens 1', 7', 10', 17', 18', 20', 25', 25', 26', 29'; Loots 2', 5', 30'; Esquelin 2', 5', 10', 13', 14', 16', 21'; Duvekot 2', 15', 22'; Sidler 3', 4', 8', 18', 19', 19', 26', 27', 29' van Marcke 9', 11', 23', 23'; Donck 10', 21'; Engelbert 12', 13', 22' |

Umpires:
Richard Mueller (GER)
Tomas Holek (CZE)

6 July 2022
17:30

| Cyprus | 2–11 | Ukraine |
|---|---|---|
| Cannas 19'; Stylianou 26' | Report | Kovalenko 4', 9', 30'; Onofriiuk 11', 16', 23', 28'; Shevchuk 24', 25', 30'; Moroz 29' |

Umpires:
Maarten Boxma (NED)
Davit Hajatyan (ARM)

6 July 2022
18:00

| Poland | 13–1 | Croatia |
|---|---|---|
| Bembenek 4', 19'; Rutkowski 8'; Pawlak 11', 15', 25', 29'; Kurowski 14', 18', 26'; Jarzynski 21', 30' | Report | Krleža 16' |

Umpires:
Benjamin Messerli (SUI)
Maksym Perepelytsya (UKR)

7 July 2022
10:00

| Luxembourg | 5–11 | Ukraine |
|---|---|---|
| Langen 1'; Ulitzka 13'; Singh 20', 23', 25' | Report | Onofriiuk 8', 13', 21'; Solomianyi 9'; Shevchuk 12', 24', 30'; Luppa 17'; Kovalenko 17', 18'; Zhmereniuk 22' |

Umpires:
Benjamin Messerli (SUI)
Tomas Holek (CZE)

7 July 2022
11:00

| Belgium | 6–0 | Cyprus |
|---|---|---|
| Englebert 4'; Biekens 10'; Duvekot 14', 30'; Loots 19'; Esquelin 22' | Report |

Umpires:
Luka Zupancic (AUT)
Maksym Perepelytsya (UKR)

7 July 2022
12:00

| Croatia | 22–2 | Armenia |
|---|---|---|
| Krleža 3', 5', 8', 8', 11', 26', 30'; Dananić 4', 9', 17', 24'; Mesarić 6', 6', 28', 30'; Grugurev 10', 12', 19'; Nemčić 10', 20', 23'; Polak 23' | Report | Zakaryan 18'; Vardanyan 22' |

Umpires:
Richard Mueller (GER)
Maarten Boxma (NED)

7 July 2022
14:00

| Ukraine | 5–8 | Poland |
|---|---|---|
| Kovalenko 2', 8', 22'; Moroz 4'; Onofriiuk 9' | Report | Kurowski 3', 28'; Pawlak 5', 11'; Rutkowski 8'; Koperski 12'; Nowakowski 21'; Bembenek 24' |

Umpires:
Benjamin Messerli (SUI)
Luka Zupancic (AUT)

7 July 2022
16:00

| Cyprus | 3–2 | Luxembourg |
|---|---|---|
| Stylianou 11', 25'; Lyne 21' | Report | Langen 8'; Krampe 22' |

Umpires:
Nick Bennett (ENG)
Germain Boutte (BEL)

7 July 2022
17:00

| Belgium | 8–3 | Croatia |
|---|---|---|
| van Marcke 4'; Sidler 6', 10', 14'; Biekens 11', 14'; Englebert 13'; Duvekot 25' | Report | Krleža 12', 30'; Nemčić 15' |

Umpires:
Benjamin Messerli (SUI)
Maarten Boxma (NED)

7 July 2022
18:00

| Armenia | 0–36 | Poland |
|---|---|---|
| | Report | Koperski 2', 9', 16', 17', 23', 28', 28'; Rutkowski 3', 8', 15', 16', 21', 30'; Pawlak 4', 5', 5', 6', 12', 13'; Jarzynski 5', 7', 14', 20', 24', 24', 26'; Kurowski 11', 11', 22', 23'; Chumenczuk 14', 18'; Bembenek 18', 27'; Nowakowski 29', 30' |

Umpires:
Nick Bennett (ENG)
Maksym Perepelytsya (UKR)

8 July 2022
10:30

| Cyprus | 17–0 | Armenia |
|---|---|---|
| Ethymiou 1', 3', 10', 12', 25', 29'; Stylianou 5', 6', 14'; Nicandrou 10', 16', 20', 27'; Lyne 17'; Cannas 21'; Weare 30', 30' | Report |

Umpires:
Lukasz Zwierzchowski (POL)
Maksym Perepelytsya (UKR)

8 July 2022
11:30

| Croatia | 6–3 | Luxembourg |
|---|---|---|
| Krleža 7', 9', 10', 11'; Grgurev 14', 30' | Report | Jagadeesh 18'; Langen 21'; Singh 30' |

Umpires:
Luka Zupancic (AUT)
Davit Hajatyan (ARM)

8 July 2022
12:30

| Belgium | 5–4 | Ukraine |
|---|---|---|
| Esquelin 2', 19'; Duvekot 3'; Sidler 7'; Biekens 24' | Report | Shevchuk 9', 13', 15'; Onofriiuk 17' |

Umpires:
Maarten Boxma (NED)
Benjamin Messerli (SUI)

8 July 2022
13:00

| Cyprus | 1–12 | Poland |
|---|---|---|
| Cannas 15' | Report | Kurowski 1', 14'; Jarzynski 9', 19', 26', 30'; Pawlak 15', 18'; Rutkowski 17', 17', 29'; Chumenczuk 21' |

Umpires:
Richard Mueller (GER)
Davit Hajatyan (ARM)

8 July 2022
17:30

| Luxembourg | 13–0 | Armenia |
|---|---|---|
| Singh 5', 13', 15', 22'; Versluys 8'; Ulitzka 10', 15', 20'; Krampe 12', 27'; Langen 17'; Jagadeesh 24', 25' | Report |

Umpires:
Nick Bennett (ENG)
Benjamin Messerli (SUI)

8 July 2022
18:30

| Ukraine | 14–2 | Croatia |
|---|---|---|
| Kaplinskyi 1'; Kovalenko 3', 19', 22'; Luppa 7'; Onofriiuk 18', 26', 30', 30'; Shevchuk 20', 28'; Zhmereniuk 23', 24', 24' | Report | Krleža 10', 24' |

Umpires:
Maarten Boxma (NED)
Davit Hajatyan (ARM)

8 July 2022
19:00

| Belgium | 7–5 | Poland |
|---|---|---|
| Biekens 2', 7'; Duvekot 12', 16', 20'; Esquelin 28'; Sidler 29' | Report | Koperski 10', 16'; Jarzynski 13'; Rutkowski 17'; Kurowski 21' |

Umpires:
Richard Mueller (GER)
Luka Zupancic (AUT)

=== Pool B ===
| Pos | Team | Pld | W | D | L | GF | GA | GD | Pts | Qualification |
|---|---|---|---|---|---|---|---|---|---|---|
| 1 | Netherlands | 5 | 5 | 0 | 0 | 66 | 9 | +57 | 15 | Semi-Finals |
| 2 | Switzerland | 5 | 4 | 0 | 1 | 39 | 24 | +15 | 12 | Semi-Finals |
| 3 | Austria | 5 | 3 | 0 | 2 | 47 | 20 | +27 | 9 | 5–8th place semi-finals |
| 4 | Turkey | 5 | 2 | 0 | 3 | 25 | 33 | −8 | 6 | 5–8th place semi-finals |
| 5 | Finland | 5 | 1 | 0 | 4 | 13 | 56 | −43 | 3 | 9/10th place game |
| 6 | Sweden | 5 | 0 | 0 | 5 | 9 | 57 | −48 | 0 | 11–13th place game |

Source: FIH
Rules for classification: 1) points; 2) matches won; 3) goal difference; 4) goals for; 5) head-to-head result; 6) field goals for.

6 July 2022
12:00

| Austria | 16–2 | Finland |
|---|---|---|
| Wellan 4', 24', 30'; Mayer 5'; Bräutigam 7'; Unterkircher 8', 10', 16', 17', 18', 19', 23', 24', 30'; Kaut 21', 25' | Report | Rantala 1'; Laiho 11' |

Umpires:
Richard Mueller (GER)
Maksym Perepelytsya (UKR)

6 July 2022
16:00

| Switzerland | 7–3 | Turkey |
|---|---|---|
| Wyss-Chodat 5'; Rickli 9'; Stomps 13', 16'; Reinhard 14', 28'; Brönnimann 19' | Report | Özkiliç 12'; Elagöz 23'; Aydin 29' |

Umpires:
Germain Boutte (BEL)
Lukasz Zwierzchowski (POL)

6 July 2022
18:30

| Netherlands | 16–1 | Sweden |
|---|---|---|
| Middendorp 2', 17'; Schop 5', 15', 19', 23' de Wijn 6', 10' van der Drift 14', 17' van Aart 19', 29' van der Kroon 25', 30'; Vos 26'; Bakker 29' | Report | Haag 9' |

Umpires:
Lukasz Zwierzchowski (POL)
Tomas Holek (CZE)

7 July 2022
10:30

| Netherlands | 20–1 | Finland |
|---|---|---|
| Bakker 1', 2', 30'; Schop 3', 12', 15+', 30' van der Drift 3', 18', 20', 27' van Aart 6', 25' de Wijn 7', 21', 22'; Middendorp 9', 12' van der Kroon 13'; Vos 25' | Report | Laiho 26' |

Umpires:
Germain Boutte (BEL)
Davit Hajatyan (ARM)

7 July 2022
11:30

| Austria | 11–5 | Turkey |
|---|---|---|
| Unterkircher 7', 16'; Wellan 9', 23', 24', 30'; Bräutigam 11', 15'; Valas 20'; Hilbert 27'; Mayer 28' | Report | Özkiliç 1'; Elagöz 17', 22', 23', 27' |

Umpires:
Nick Bennett (ENG)
Lukasz Zwierzchowski (POL)

7 July 2022
12:30

| Sweden | 1–14 | Switzerland |
|---|---|---|
| Wilander 26' | Report | Krüsi 3'; Brönnimann 5', 5', 10', 14', 24', 30'; Wyss-Chodat 10', 17', 23'; Rickli 13', 24', 28'; Landtwing 29' |

Umpires:
Mayksym Perepelytsya (UKR)
Tomas Holek (CZE)

7 July 2022
16:30

| Sweden | 1–15 | Austria |
|---|---|---|
| Gulinck 12' | Report | Wellan 3', 8', 22'; Unterkircher 7', 15', 15+', 16', 22'; Bräutigam 10', 20', 24', 26'; Kaut 13'; Hilbert 23'; Soldat 30' |

Umpires:
Richard Mueller (GER)
Lukasz Zwierzchowski (POL)

7 July 2022
17:30

| Turkey | 7–4 | Finland |
|---|---|---|
| Özkiliç 3', 19', 30'; Ataş 10'; Ekinci 20', 29'; Elagöz 22' | Report | Kauppinen 13'; Laiho 17', 25'; Brophy 19' |

Umpires:
Tomas Holek (CZE)
Davit Hajatyan (ARM)

7 July 2022
18:30

| Switzerland | 3–15 | Netherlands |
|---|---|---|
| Brönnimann 6'; Stomps 13'; Reinhard 30' | Report | Middendorp 1', 9'; Vos 3'; Schop 5', 23' van der Drift 5', 10', 15', 26' van Aart 8', 13' de Wijn 17', 24'; Bakker 27', 28' |

Umpires:
Richard Mueller (GER)
Lukasz Zwierzchowski (POL)

8 July 2022
10:00

| Turkey | 6–2 | Sweden |
|---|---|---|
| Ataş 2'; Özkiliç 6', 23', 30'; Aydin 10'; Elagöz 21' | Report | Magnusson 9'; Lennevi 16' |

Umpires:
Maarten Boxma (NED)
Germain Boutte (BEL)

8 July 2022
11:00

| Austria | 0–6 | Netherlands |
|---|---|---|
| | Report | van Aart 1' de Wijn 3'; Bakker 7'; Schop 8', 27'; Middendorp 23' |

Umpires:
Nick Bennett (ENG)
Tomas Holek (CZE)

8 July 2022
12:00

| Finland | 0–9 | Switzerland |
|---|---|---|
| | Report | Krüsi 3'; Brönnimann 4', 22'; Wyss-Chodat 9'; Stomps 10'; Nitsch 17'; Reinhard 19', 28'; Andereggen 23' |

Umpires:
Lukasz Zwierzchowski (POL)
Germain Boutte (BEL)

8 July 2022
16:00

| Netherlands | 9–4 | Turkey |
|---|---|---|
| van Aart 4', 5'; Vos 6' de Wijn 9'; Schop 19', 23'; Bakker 20', 27' van der Kroon 30' | Report | Elagöz 11', 17', 29', 30' |

Umpires:
Maksym Perepelytsya (UKR)
Nick Bennett (ENG)

8 July 2022
17:00

| Finland | 6–4 | Sweden |
|---|---|---|
| Rantala 1'; Laiho 9', 22', 23', 25'; Brophy 21' | Report | Gulinck 12', 18'; Lennevi 23'; Rydin 28' |

Umpires:
Luka Zupancic (AUT)
Tomas Holek (CZE)

8 July 2022
18:00

| Switzerland | 6–5 | Austria |
|---|---|---|
| Krüsi 5'; Andereggen 6'; Brönnimann 11'; Reinhard 20'; Stomps 20', 30' | Report | Unterkircher 7', 27'; Wellan 16'; Kaut 29'; Valas 30' |

Umpires:
Germain Boutte (BEL)
Lukasz Zwierzchowski (POL)

== Eleventh to thirteenth place classification ==
Cross-over
14 July
Sweden | 14
Armenia | 1

eleventh place
14 July
Sweden | 5
Luxembourg | 6

=== Cross-over ===
9 July 2022
09:00

| Sweden | 14–1 | Armenia |
|---|---|---|
| Lennevi 4', 6'; Haag 6', 23'; Rydin 7', 20', 20', 27', 30'; Taylor 11', 12'; Magnusson 19', 25'; Wilander 29' | Report | Sharoyan 8' |

Umpires:
Maarten Boxma (NED)
Germain Boutte (BEL)

=== Eleventh and twelfth place ===
9 July 2023
12:50

| Sweden | 5–6 | Luxembourg |
|---|---|---|
| Wilander 3', 11'; Rydin 13', 14', 29' | Report | Ulitzka 5'; Langen 8', 22', 30'; Versluys 16', 18' |

Umpires:
Maksym Perepelytsya (UKR)
Maarten Boxma (NED)

== Ninth and tenth place ==
9 July 2023
11:20

| Cyprus | 4–2 | Finland |
|---|---|---|
| Efthymiou 12', 28', 29'; Butler Denby 20' | Report | Brophy 15'; Rantala 22' |

Umpires:
Lukasz Zwierzchowski (POL)
Richard Mueller (GER)

== Fifth to eighth place classification ==
=== Bracket ===
Cross-overs
9 July
Austria | 12
Croatia | 6
9 July
Ukraine | 6
Turkey | 4

Fifth place
9 July
Austria | 6
Ukraine | 4
Seventh place
9 July
Croatia | 3
Turkey | 6

==== Cross-overs ====
9 July 2022
09:20

| Austria | 12–6 | Croatia |
|---|---|---|
| Wellan 3', 14'; Mayer 7'; Valas 9', 21'; Unterkircher 10', 23', 26', 27', 29'; Soldat 11'; Kaut 18' | Report | Mesarić 4', 12', 17', 19'; Krleža 18'; Dananić 28' |

Umpires:
Maksym Perepelytsya (UKR)
Richard Mueller (GER)

9 July 2022
10:10

| Ukraine | 6–4 | Turkey |
|---|---|---|
| Kovalenko 8', 27'; Shevchuk 8', 30'; Kaplinskyi 25'; Luppa 28' | Report | Demirel 13', 18'; Ataş 23'; Özkiliç 25' |

Umpires:
Luka Zupancic (AUT)
Benjamin Messerli (SUI)

=== 7th/8th place game ===
9 July 2022
13:10

| Croatia | 3–6 | Turkey |
|---|---|---|
| Mesarić 7', 8'; Nemčič 10' | Report | Demirel 2'; Özkiliç 7', 8', 10'; Dönmez 20', 21' |

Umpires:
Luka Zupancic (AUT)
Tomas Holek (CZE)

=== 5th/6th place game ===
9 July 2022
14:20

| Austria | 6–4 | Ukraine |
|---|---|---|
| Soldat 5'; Wellan 8', 24'; Unterkircher 13', 15', 30' | Report | Moroz 11'; Kovalenko 15'; Onofriiuk 18'; Shevchuk 29' |

Umpires:
Richard Mueller (GER)
Germain Boutte (BEL)

== First to fourth place classification ==
Semi-finals
9 July
Belgium | 8
Switzerland | 2
9 July
Netherlands | 5
Poland | 3

Final
9 July
Belgium | 1
Netherlands | 4
Third place
9 July
Switzerland | 2
Poland | 8

=== Semi-finals ===
9 July 2022
10:30

| Belgium | 8–2 | Switzerland |
|---|---|---|
| Biekens 5', 24' van Marcke 13', 30'; Sidler 14'; Duvekot 17', 27'; Englebert 20' | Report | Krüsi 1'; Stomps 21' |

Umpires:
Tomas Holek (CZE)
Maarten Boxma (NED)

9 July 2022
11:40

| Netherlands | 5–3 | Poland |
|---|---|---|
| van Aart 3', 16'; Schop 12' de Wijn 22', 28' | Report | Rutkowski 7'; Pawlak 18'; Koperski 26' |

Umpires:
Nick Bennett (ENG)
Germain Boutte (BEL)

=== Third place game ===
9 July 2022
14:40

| Switzerland | 2–8 | Poland |
|---|---|---|
| Brönnimann 7'; Rickli 17' | Report | Rutkowski 7', 20', 28'; Jarzynski 19', 29'; Pawlak 23'; Kurowski 27'; Nowakowski 30' |

Umpires:
Nick Bennett (ENG)
Tomas Holek (CZE)

=== Final ===
9 July 2022
15:50

| Belgium | 1–4 | Netherlands |
|---|---|---|
| Esquelin 22' | Report | Vos 2'; Schop 4' van Aart 10' van der Drift 17' |

Umpires:
Lukasz Zwierzchowski (POL)
Benjamin Messerli (SUI)

== Final standing ==
| Rank | Team |
|---|---|
| 1st place, gold medalist(s) | Netherlands |
| 2nd place, silver medalist(s) | Belgium |
| 3rd place, bronze medalist(s) | Poland |
| 4 | Switzerland |
| 5 | Austria |
| 6 | Ukraine |
| 7 | Turkey |
| 8 | Croatia |
| 9 | Cyprus |
| 10 | Finland |
| 11 | Luxembourg |
| 12 | Sweden |
| 13 | Armenia |

Qualified for the 2024 World Cup
