= Strąk =

Strąk is a Polish surname. Notable people with the surname include:

- Paweł Strąk (born 1983), Polish footballer
- Robert Strąk (born 1967), Polish politician
