= 2026 Women's EuroHockey5s Championship =

Hockey 5s tournament

Tournament details
- Host country: Poland
- City: Walcz
- Dates: 6–9 August
- Teams: 4 (from 1 confederation)
- Venue: Centralny Ośrodek

Final positions
- Champions: Ukraine (1st title)
- Runner-up: Sweden
- Third place: Poland

Tournament statistics
- Matches played: 14
- Goals scored: 122 (8.71 per match)
- Top scorer: (Ukraine) Karyna Leonova (18 goals)
- Best player: (Ukraine) Karyna Leonova
- Best goalkeeper: (Bulgaria) Lora Staykova

The 2026 Women's EuroHockey5s Championship was the third edition of the Women's EuroHockey5s Championship. It was held at the same time as the men's tournament in Walcz, Poland, from 6 to 9 August 2026.

The tournament served as a continental qualifier for the 2028 FIH Hockey5s World Cup.

== Teams ==
- Bulgaria
- Poland
- Sweden
- Ukraine

== Preliminary round ==
=== Pool A ===
Pos	Team	Pld	W	D	L	GF	GA	GD	Pts	Qualification
1	Ukraine	6	6	0	0	48	13	+35	18	Final
2	Sweden	6	4	0	2	29	25	+4	12	Final
3	Poland (H)	6	1	0	5	22	34	−12	3	Third place match
4	Bulgaria	6	1	0	5	12	39	−27	3	Third place match

Source: FIH
Rules for classification: 1) points; 2) matches won; 3) goal difference; 4) goals for; 5) head-to-head result; 6) field goals for.
(H) Hosts

6 August 2026
11:00

Ukraine	9–2	Bulgaria
Leonova 2', 13', 14', 20', 25', 27'; Movchan 7', 29'; Tanchenko 15'	Report	Getova 15'; Bosolova 17'

Umpires:
Paula Slawinska (POL)
Serap Yürükoğlu (TUR)

6 August 2026
12:00

Poland	3–5	Sweden
Rubacha 5', 25'; Nowakowska 20'	Report	Thien 2', 22', 27'; Kalling-Smith 14', 18'

Umpires:
Marcel Knakowski (GER)
Maksym Perepelytsya (UKR)

6 August 2026
17:00

Sweden	6–2	Bulgaria
Thien 1', 7', 18'; S. Guitink 4', 23'; Justus 12'	Report	Sinabova 6'; Stamenova 12'

Umpires:
Oleksandra Lynnyk (UKR)
Lukasz Orzeł (POL)

6 August 2026
18:00

Ukraine	6–1	Poland
Tanchenko 12', 29'; Popova 15'; Leonova 19', 25'; Zaitseva 30'	Report	Kosińska 28'

Umpires:
Lubos Kamendy (SVK)
Daniel Stewart (ENG)

7 August 2026
11:00

Sweden	1–10	Ukraine
Kalling-Smith 27'	Report	Leonova 3', 17', 20', 26'; Movchan 7', 12'; Honcharenko 13', 29'; Korobkina 25'; Tanchenko 28'

Umpires:
Lubos Kamendy (SVK)
Paula Slawinska (POL)

7 August 2026
12:00

Poland	4–5	Bulgaria
Kuczma 4'; Rubacha 10', 16'; Brzezińska 29'	Report	Indzhova 13'; Peevska 21', 24'; Chavkarska 26', 27'

Umpires:
Marcel Knakowski (GER)
Oleksandra Lynnyk (UKR)

7 August 2026
17:00

Bulgaria	1–9	Ukraine
Bosolova 19'	Report	Leonova 2', 10', 18', 26'; Shyshyna 4', 8', 26'; Movchan 6'; Tanchenko 28'

Umpires:
Lukasz Orzeł (POL)
Serap Yürükoğlu (TUR)

7 August 2026
18:00

Sweden	9–3	Poland
Thien 1', 21'; Schrader 6', 10'; E. Guitink 10', 26', 26'; Kalling-Smith 11', 22'	Report	Rubacha 15', 19'; Kranz 28'

Umpires:
Daniel Stewart (ENG)
Maksym Perepelytsya (UKR)

8 August 2026
11:00

Bulgaria	2–5	Sweden
Petkova 1'; Indzhova 19'	Report	E. Guitink 8', 14', 19'; Kalling-Smith 12', 28'

Umpires:
Oleksandra Lynnyk (UKR)
Paula Slawinska (POL)

8 August 2026
12:00

Poland	5–9	Ukraine
Kranz 14'; Rubacha 24', 25', 27'; Łosiak 29'	Report	Leonova 4', 14'; Honcharenko 5', 21', 30+'; Shyshyna 6'; Tanchenko 12', 13'; Zaitseva 20'

Umpires:
Marcel Knakowski (GER)
Serap Yürükoğlu (TUR)

8 August 2026
17:00

Ukraine	5–3	Sweden
Popova 6', 12', 21'; Honcharenko 10'; Shyshyna 21'	Report	Kalling-Smith 14', 30'; Thien 28'

Umpires:
Daniel Stewart (ENG)
Lukasz Orzeł (POL)

8 August 2026
18:00

Bulgaria	0–6	Poland
	Report	Rubacha 10', 27'; Kranz 11', 23'; Kuczma 13'; Łosiak 15'

Umpires:
Lubos Kamendy (SVK)
Maksym Perepelytsya (UKR)

== Third place match ==
9 August 2026
11:00

Poland	3–2	Bulgaria
Kranz 2'; Rubacha 10'; Kosińska 15'	Report	Bosolova 18', 24'

Umpires:
Lubos Kamendy (SVK)
Maksym Perepelytsya (UKR)

== Final ==
9 August 2026
13:00

Ukraine	4–2	Sweden
Popova 7', 21'; Shyshyna 25'; Zaitseva 28'	Report	Justus 11'; Schrader 30'

Umpires:
Lukasz Orzeł (POL)
Serap Yürükoğlu (TUR)

== Statistics ==
=== Final standings ===
Pos	Team
1st place, gold medalist(s)	Ukraine
2nd place, silver medalist(s)	Sweden
3rd place, bronze medalist(s)	Poland
4	Bulgaria

Source: FIH

=== Goalscorers ===
There were 122 goals scored in 14 matches, for an average of 8.71 goals per match.

18 goals

- (Ukraine) Karyna Leonova

12 goals

- (Poland) Zuzanna Rubacha

9 goals

- (Sweden) Emilia Kalling-Smith
- (Sweden) Nora Thien

7 goals

- (Ukraine) Anna Tanchenko

6 goals

- (Sweden) Emma Guitink
- (Ukraine) Olha Honcharenko
- (Ukraine) Kateryna Popova
- (Ukraine) Anastasiia Shyshyna

5 goals

- (Poland) Aleksandra Kranz
- (Ukraine) Veronika Movchan

4 goals

- (Bulgaria) Ventsislava Bosolova

3 goals

- (Sweden) Laetitia Schrader
- (Ukraine) Valeriia Zaitseva

2 goals

- (Bulgaria) Siyana Chavkarska
- (Bulgaria) Tereza Indzhova
- (Bulgaria) Desislava Peevska
- (Poland) Patrycja Kosińska
- (Poland) Martyną Kuczma
- (Poland) Adrianna Łosiak
- (Sweden) Sofia Guitink
- (Sweden) Paula Justus

1 goal

- (Bulgaria) Simona Getova
- (Bulgaria) Dayana Petkova
- (Bulgaria) Aleksandra Sinabova
- (Bulgaria) Elizabet Stamenova
- (Poland) Wiktoria Brzezińska
- (Poland) Natasza Nowakowska
- (Ukraine) Veronika Korobkina

Source: FIH

== See also ==
- 2026 Men's EuroHockey5s Championship
