= Sander de Wijn =

Dutch field hockey player

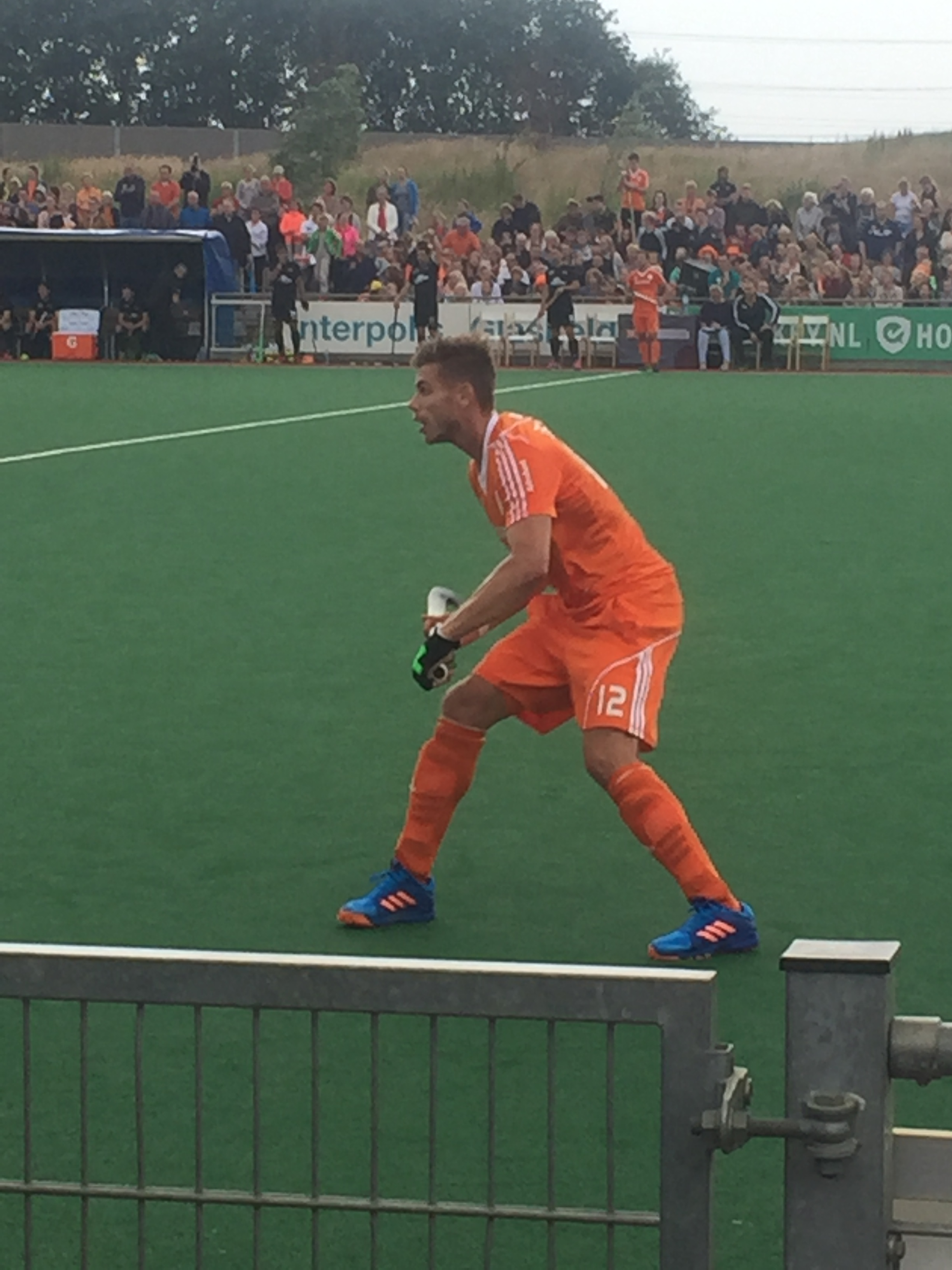

Personal information
- Full name: Sander Sebastian; Robert Jan de Wijn
- Born: 2 May 1990 (age 36) Boxmeer, Netherlands
- Height: 1.83 m (6 ft 0 in)
- Weight: 78 kg (172 lb)

Sport
- Sport: Field hockey
- Position: Defender
Youth career
- Years: Team
- 1998–2008: Union
Senior career
Years	Team	Caps	Goals
2008–2026	Kampong	-	-
2018	→ UniKL	-	-
National team
Years	Team	Caps	Goals
2011–2021	Netherlands	161	(8)
2022–2024	Netherlands hockey5s	13	(19)
Medal record
Representing the Netherlands
Men's field hockey
Olympic Games
Silver medal – second place	2012 London	Team
World Cup
Silver medal – second place	2014 The Hague
Silver medal – second place	2018 Bhubaneswar
EuroHockey Championship
Gold medal – first place	2015 London
Gold medal – first place	2017 Amstelveen
Gold medal – first place	2021 Amstelveen
Silver medal – second place	2011 Mönchengladbach
Bronze medal – third place	2019 Antwerp
Champions Trophy
Silver medal – second place	2012 Melbourne
Bronze medal – third place	2011 Auckland
Hockey World League
Gold medal – first place	2012–13 New Delhi	Team
Men's hockey5s
Hockey5s World Cup
Gold medal – first place	2024 Muscat
EuroHockey5s Championship
Gold medal – first place	2022 Walcz

Sander Sebastiaan Robert Jan de Wijn (Dutch pronunciation: [ˈsɑndər də ˈʋɛin]; born 2 May 1990) is a Dutch former field hockey player who played as a defender for Kampong and the Dutch national team.

== Career ==
At the 2012 Summer Olympics, he competed for the national team in the men's tournament winning a silver medal. He also competed at the 2016 Summer Olympics, where the Netherlands lost the bronze-medal match to Germany in the field hockey tournament. In March 2026, he announced his retirement from playing hockey. In his final season, he won his second Men's Euro Hockey League with Kampong, scoring two goals in the competition.

== Honours ==
=== Club ===
Kampong

- Hoofdklasse: 2016–17, 2017–18, 2023–24
- Gold Cup: 2023–24
- Euro Hockey League: 2015–16, 2025–26

UniKL

- TNB Cup: 2018

=== International ===
Netherlands

- Summer Olympics silver medal: 2012
- EuroHockey Championship: 2015, 2017, 2021
- Hockey World League: 2012–13

Netherlands hockey5s

- Hockey5s World Cup: 2024
- EuroHockey5s Championship: 2022

=== Individual ===
- Hoofdklasse Player of the Season: 2014–15, 2016–17, 2023–24
