= Women's EuroHockey5s Championship =

- Most recent season or competition: 2026 Women's EuroHockey5s Championship
- Sport: Hockey5s
- Founded: 2022; 4 years ago
- First season: 2022
- No. of teams: 5
- Confederation: EHF (Europe)
- Most recent champion: Ukraine (2026)
- Most titles: Netherlands; Poland; Ukraine (1 Title)

The Women's EuroHockey5s Championship (also known as Women's EuroHockey5s World Cup Qualifier) is a women's international Hockey5's tournament organized by the European Hockey Federation. The event is played in Hockey 5s format, a 5-a-side game that is played on a smaller field size. The winning team becomes the European Champions and qualifies for the FIH Hockey5s World Cup.

The first three editions took place in Wałcz, won by three different teams, Netherlands, Poland and Ukraine. The top 3 teams from the inaugural tournament qualified for the first ever Hockey5s World Cup in 2024.

== Results ==
Year	Host	Final			Third place match			Number of teams
Year	Host	Winner	Score	Runner-up	Third place	Score	Fourth place	Number of teams
2023; Details	Walcz, Poland	Netherlands	7–3	Poland	Ukraine	6–2	Switzerland	10
2024; Details	Walcz, Poland	Poland	4–4 (2–0 p.s.o.)	Ukraine	Italy	3–1	Wales	9
2026; Details	Walcz, Poland	Ukraine	4–2	Sweden	Poland	3–2	Bulgaria	4

== Successful national teams ==
Teams reaching the top four
Team	Champions	Runners-up	Third place	Fourth place
Poland	1 (2024*)	1 (2023*)	1 (2026*)	
Ukraine	1 (2026)	1 (2024)	1 (2023)	
Netherlands	1 (2023)			
Sweden		1 (2026)		
Italy			1 (2024)	
Switzerland				1 (2023)
Wales				1 (2024)
Bulgaria				1 (2026)

* = host country

=== Team appearances ===
Team	(Poland) 2023	(Poland) 2024	(Poland) 2026	Total
Austria	6th	–	–	1
Bulgaria	–	–	4th	1
Finland	–	9th	–	1
Georgia	10th	–	–	1
Italy	–	3rd	–	1
Lithuania	–	7th	–	1
Luxembourg	–	8th	–	1
Netherlands	1st	–	–	1
Poland	2nd	1st	3rd	3
Slovakia	9th	–	–	1
Sweden	8th	6th	2nd	3
Switzerland	4th	–	–	1
Turkey	5th	5th	–	2
Ukraine	3rd	2nd	1st	3
Wales	7th	4th	–	2
Total (15)	10	9	4	

=== Debut of teams ===
Year	Debutants	Total
2023	Austria, Georgia, Netherlands, Poland, Slovakia, Sweden, Switzerland, Turkey, Ukraine, Wales	10
2024	Finland, Italy, Lithuania, Luxembourg	4
2026	Bulgaria	1
Total		15

== See also ==
- Men's EuroHockey5s Championship
