= Godela Habel =

German painter (1929–2022)

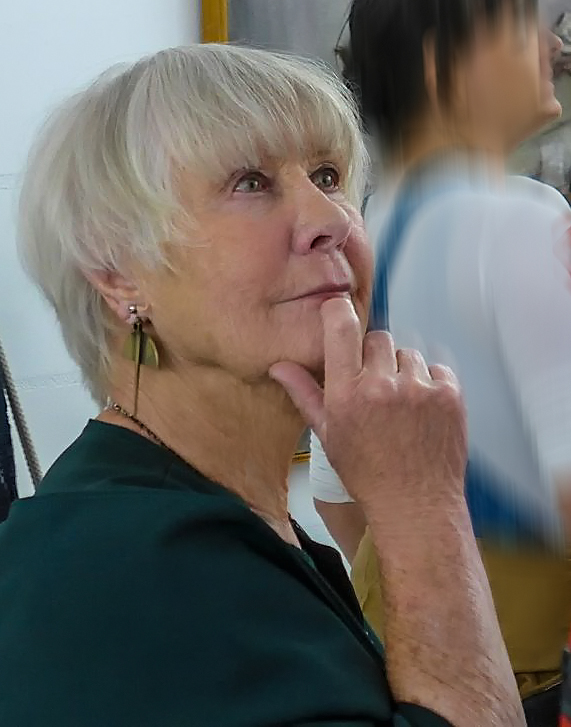
Godela Habel, 2015

Godela Habel (18 September 1929 – 12 February 2022) was a German painter and artist.

== Life and work ==
Godela Habel was born in Deutsch Krone, Posen-West Prussia, Weimar Germany, on 18 September 1929. She studied painting and graphic design from 1950 to 1953 at art schools in Wuppertal and Hanover. Known for her paintings and collages, she combined the methods of drawing and painting in her occasionally secretive work and made allowance for individual associations and interpretations. In February 2000, she displayed at an exhibition about "The Paint Theme" (German: "Thema Farbe") at Künstlerforum, Bonn, some more or less compacted lines and areas on paper and used paint in minutely shaded levels of brown, white and black, which were infiltrated by a hint of red. In the 1990s she completed her collage work and focused on drawings. She lived and worked in Mehren. Habel died in Potsdam on 12 February 2022, at the age of 92.

== Awards ==
Godela Habel obtained the GEDOK art award in 1998, with a value of 5,000,-€, which was donated in 1988 as the Dr.-Theobald-Simon-Award by the art lover and patron Gabriele Vossebein in the memory of her father, the former director of the Bitburger brewery.

== Exhibitions ==
- 1982: 7 Artists, Bonn Bad Godesberg
- 1984: Winter exhibition, Arbeitsgemeinschaft Siegerländer Künstlerinnen und Künstler e.V.
- 1986: Individual exhibitions in Kunstverein Siegen e.V. Protestant Academy Schmitten-Arnoldsheim and glas museum Rheinbach
- 1989: Individual exhibition in Gärtnerhaus Bonn
- 1997: Akquisition of a drawing by Rheinische Landesmuseum Bonn
- 2000: The Paint Theme, Künstlerforum Bonn
- 2002: Wechselweise, Arbeitsgemeinschaft Siegerländer Künstlerinnen und Künstler e.V.
- 2003: Individual exhibition in Betzdorf
- 2004: Individual exhibition im Gärtnerhaus Bonn
- 2005: Korrespondenzen, Künstlerforum Bonn
- 2006: Einzelausstellung in der Theatergemeinde Bonn
- 2009: Works on Paper, Theatergemeinde Bonn
- 2014: Collages and Drawings from 14 June until 13 July 2014 in the "Kleiner Kunstraum 21" of Gotthart Eichhorn in Geiselbach

== Publications ==
- Ursula Toyka-Fuong, Petra Rapp-Neumann, Hilla Jablonsky, Ruth Schirmer, Edith Oellers-Teuber, Ula Wienke, Margaret Klare, Ute Jansen, Irene Kulnig, Borghild Eckermann, Godela Habel, Susanne Krell, Elsbeth Tatarczyk-Welte, Victoria Westmacott-Wrede: Ausgezeichnet: Künstlerinnen und Stifterin des Dr.-Theobald-Simon-Kunstpreises. ISBN 3-934532-23-3. (German)
