= Netherlands men's national hockey5s team =

Netherlands
- Nickname(s): Oranje 5s
- Association: Royal Dutch Hockey Federation (Koninklijke Nederlandse Hockey Bond)
- Confederation: EHF (Europe)
- Head Coach: Gerold Hoeben

FIH ranking
- Current: 1 (March 2024)

World Cup
- Appearances: 1 (first in 2024)
- Best result: (gold) 1st (2024)

EuroHockey5s Championship
- Appearances: 1 (first in 2022)
- Best result: (gold) 1st (2022)

The Netherlands men's national hockey5s team represents the Netherlands in hockey 5s and is sanctioned by the Royal Dutch Hockey Association.

== History ==
The Netherlands men's senior Hockey 5s team was formed in 2022 ahead of the 2022 Men's EuroHockey5s Championship in Poland. The Royal Dutch Hockey Association (KNHB) was already planning to form a hockey 5s team in 2020 ahead of the EuroHockey5s Championship then scheduled to be held in Ukraine.

The first ever practice match was played against Belgium in Kontich, Flanders on 29 June 2022. Gerold Hoeben is the inaugural coach who formed a team from standard field hockey players.

The inaugural EuroHockey5s held in Poland was won by the Netherlands. The tournament was not participated by traditional field hockey nations such as England, Germany and Spain which are more skeptical of the 5-a-side variant of hockey.

However the KNHB withdrew the Netherlands from the 2024 EuroHockey5s to focus on its field hockey program and conflicting schedules.

They won the inaugural 2024 Men's FIH Hockey5s World Cup in Oman.

== Tournament record ==
=== World Cup ===
FIH World Cup record
Year	Round	Position	Pld	W	D*	L	GF	GA
(Oman) 2024	Final	1st	6	6	0	0	36	21
Total	1/1	1 title	6	6	0	0	36	21

=== European Championships ===
EuroHockey5s Championship record
Year	Round	Position	Pld	W	D*	L	GF	GA
(Poland) 2022	Final	1st	7	7	0	0	78	13
(Poland) 2024	Withdrew							
(Poland) 2026	Did not participate							
Total	1/3	1 title	7	7	0	0	78	13
