= Mirosław Czech =

Polish journalist and politician

- Мирослав Чех
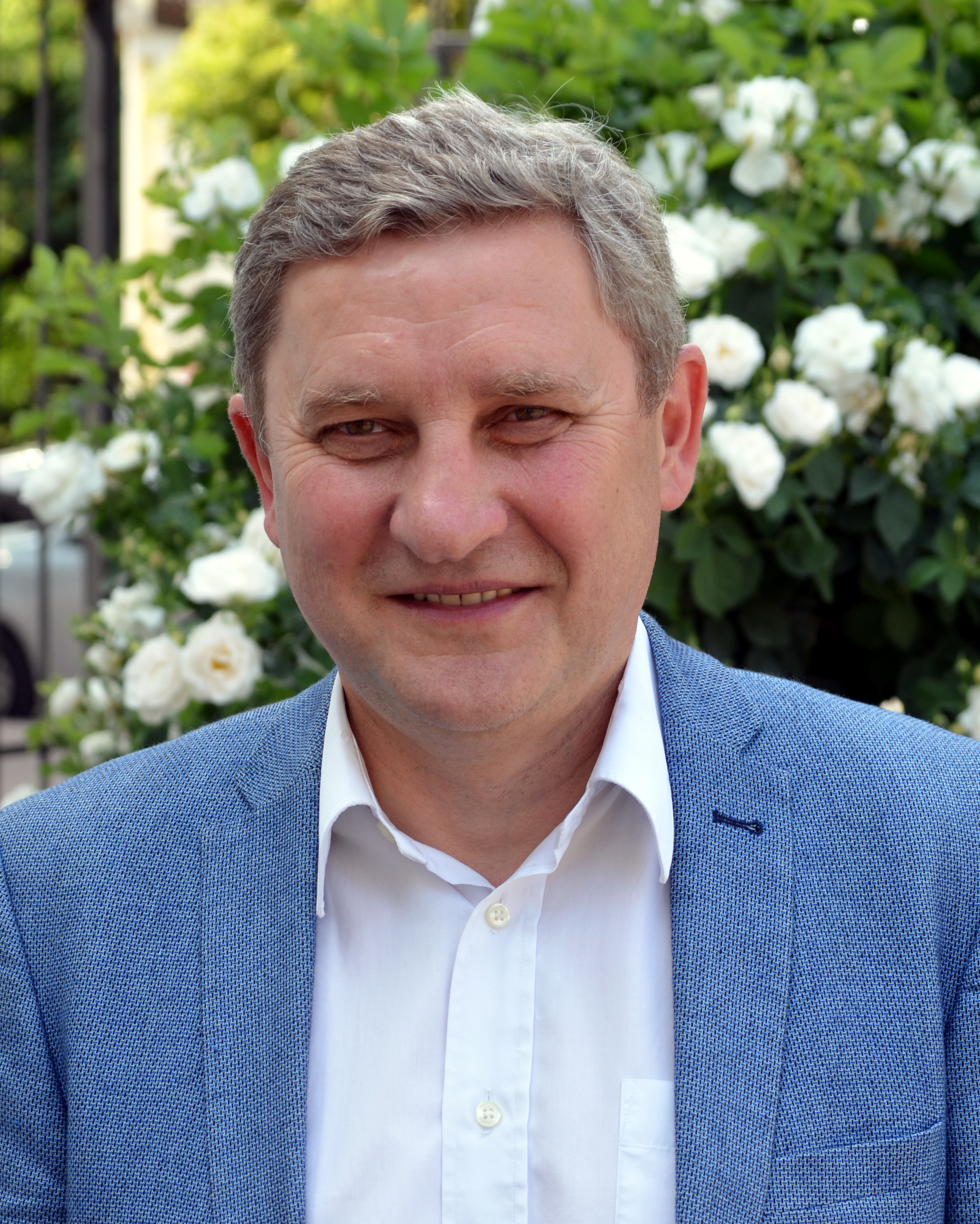
- Czech in 2019

Member of the Sejm
- In office 19 September 1993 – 23 September 2001
- Parliamentary group: Freedom Union
- Constituency: No. 29 (Olsztyn)

Personal details
- Born: 16 December 1962 (age 63) Wałcz, Poland
- Party: Freedom Union; Democratic Union
- Education: Warsaw University

Mirosław Czech (Ukrainian: Мирослав Чех, romanized: Myroslav Chekh; born 16 December 1962) is a Polish journalist and politician of Ukrainian descent who served as a deputy of the Sejm from 1993 to 2001. In 1987 he graduated from the faculty of history of Warsaw University. A journalist by profession, Czech worked as an editor of the publishing house "Tyrsa" in Warsaw and from 1990 to 1995 was chief editor of Zustriczi (lit. 'meetings').

Czech was elected to the Sejm in 1993 and 1997 on the list of the Democratic Union and the Freedom Union. In 1993 he was elected in Koszalin, four years later in Olsztyn (both times was selected for the nationwide list). In 2001 he tried unsuccessfully to re-election in Olsztyn.

== Sources ==
- (in Ukrainian) Як Москва відкрила браму до пекла на Волині. І українці, і поляки були пішаками у грі великих держав // «iPress.ua» from: Mirosław Czech.
- (in Polish) Jak Moskwa rozpętała piekło na Wołyniu // Gazeta Wyborcza, 08.03.2013 21:14
