= 2026 Men's EuroHockey5s Championship =

Hockey 5s tournament

Tournament details
- Host country: Poland
- City: Walcz
- Dates: 6–9 August
- Teams: 5 (from 1 confederation)
- Venue: Centralny Ośrodek

Final positions
- Champions: Ukraine (1st title)
- Runner-up: Poland
- Third place: Sweden

Tournament statistics
- Matches played: 20
- Goals scored: 237 (11.85 per match)
- Top scorer: (Ukraine) Volodymyr Kaplinskyi (30 goals)
- Best player: (Ukraine) Andrii Koshelenko
- Best goalkeeper: (Slovakia) Marek Polák

The 2026 Men's EuroHockey5s Championship was the third edition of the Men's EuroHockey5s Championship. It was held at the same time as the women's tournament in Walcz, Poland, from 6 to 9 August 2026.

The tournament served as a continental qualifier for the 2028 FIH Hockey5s World Cup.

== Teams ==
- Bulgaria
- Poland
- Slovakia
- Sweden
- Ukraine

== Round Robin ==
=== Pool A ===
Pos	Team	Pld	W	D	L	GF	GA	GD	Pts
1	Ukraine	8	8	0	0	85	18	+67	24
2	Poland (H)	8	6	0	2	74	26	+48	18
3	Sweden	8	2	1	5	32	63	−31	7
4	Slovakia	8	2	1	5	28	62	−34	7
5	Bulgaria	8	1	0	7	18	68	−50	3

Source: FIH
Rules for classification: 1) points; 2) matches won; 3) goal difference; 4) goals for; 5) head-to-head result; 6) field goals for.
(H) Hosts

6 August 2026
09:00

Ukraine	9–1	Bulgaria
Kaplinskyi 7', 15', 21', 25'; Kostechko 7'; Koshelenko 10', 20'; Solomianyi 14'; Shevchuk 17'	Report	Balev 29'

Umpires:
Lubos Kamendy (SVK)
Lukasz Orzeł (POL)

6 August 2026
10:00

Sweden	8–5	Slovakia
Lunde 6', 27'; Tyne 7', 14'; Karlsson 11', 28'; Haag 13'; Rodewi 21'	Report	Kajaba 5', 16', 27'; Garaj 8'; Krajčir 19'

Umpires:
Oleksandra Lynnyk (UKR)
Maksym Perepelytsya (UKR)

6 August 2026
16:00

Poland	11–2	Bulgaria
Rataj 5', 20', 25', 28'; Turij 7'; Mc. Poltaszewski 10', 27'; Mikołajczak 14'; Ma. Poltaszewski 22'; Małecki 24', 29'	Report	Vasilev 4', 19'

Umpires:
Lubos Kamendy (SVK)
Serap Yürükoğlu (TUR)

6 August 2026
19:00

Ukraine	12–1	Slovakia
Boiko 5'; Kaplinskyi 7', 13'; Koshelenko 10', 21', 26', 30'; Solomianyi 11', 13'; Luppa 14'; Shevchuk 17', 18'	Report	Nedeliak 8'

Umpires:
Marcel Knakowski (GER)
Paula Slawinska (POL)

6 August 2026
20:00

Sweden	2–12	Poland
Taylor 6'; Lunde 7'	Report	Turij 3', 12', 20', 24'; Bieńkowski 8', 28'; Małecki 12', 14'; Mc. Poltaszewski 15'; Stotko 21'; Rataj 29'; Ma. Poltaszewski 30'

Umpires:
Oleksandra Lynnyk (UKR)
Daniel Stewart (ENG)

7 August 2026
09:00

Slovakia	6–4	Bulgaria
Krajčir 4', 13'; Blazovsky 7'; Garaj 9'; Mišovič 9'; Belošovič 23'	Report	Milkovski 8'; Balev 18', 29'; Lekov 23'

Umpires:
Lukasz Orzeł (POL)
Maksym Perepelytsya (UKR)

7 August 2026
10:00

Ukraine	8–3	Poland
Shevchuk 5', 10', 21', 25'; Kaplinskyi 8', 28'; Solomianyi 14'; Koshelenko 22'	Report	Rataj 4', 12'; Małecki 27'

Umpires:
Daniel Stewart (ENG)
Marcel Knakowski (GER)

7 August 2026
16:00

Bulgaria	2–6	Sweden
Antonov 7'; Vasilev 29'	Report	Taylor 5'; Karlsson 8'; Lunde 13', 14' de Groen 21', 26'

Umpires:
Daniel Stewart (ENG)
Paula Slawinska (POL)

7 August 2026
19:00

Poland	8–4	Slovakia
Rataj 3', 15', 27'; Stotko 5', 18'; Mc. Poltaszewski 9'; Bieńkowski 12'; Małecki 19'	Report	Garaj 11'; Kajaba 17', 24'; Blazovsky 21'

Umpires:
Oleksandra Lynnyk (UKR)
Serap Yürükoğlu (TUR)

7 August 2026
20:00

Sweden	3–10	Ukraine
Rodewi 5'; Lunde 17'; Taylor 21'	Report	Luppa 3', 19', 26'; Solomianyi 5', 10'; Shevchuk 6', 29'; Kaplinskyi 7', 27'; Boiko 22'

Umpires:
Lubos Kamendy (SVK)
Marcel Knakowski (GER)

8 August 2026
09:00

Bulgaria	2–14	Ukraine
Vasilev 12'; Lekov 25'	Report	Koshelenko 3', 8', 14', 15'; Kaplinskyi 7', 20', 26', 27', 30'; Shevchuk 13', 17', 22', 24', 28'

Umpires:
Daniel Stewart (ENG)
Serap Yürükoğlu (TUR)

8 August 2026
10:00

Slovakia	4–4	Sweden
Krajčir 3'; Garaj 8'; Kajaba 20'; Nedeliak 21'	Report	Lunde 2'; Magnusson 6'; Karlsson 22'; Haag 28'

Umpires:
Lukasz Orzeł (POL)
Marcel Knakowski (GER)

8 August 2026
13:00

Bulgaria	1–14	Poland
Vasilev 29'	Report	Małecki 2'; Turij 8', 28'; Rataj 9', 10', 19', 25', 25'; Mc. Poltaszewski 10'; Bieńkowski 14', 23', 29'; Ma. Poltaszewski 15'; Mikołajczak 21'

Umpires:
Lubos Kamendy (SVK)
Oleksandra Lynnyk (UKR)

8 August 2026
19:00

Slovakia	2–12	Ukraine
Krajčir 9'; Belošovič 21'	Report	Kaplinskyi 1', 13', 14', 27', 30'; Koshelenko 2', 14'; Solomianyi 11'; Luppa 19'; Shevchuk 28'; Boiko 29'; Kostechko 30'

Umpires:
Lukasz Orzeł (POL)
Paula Slawinska (POL)

8 August 2026
20:00

Poland	11–3	Sweden
Rataj 2', 7', 10', 10'; Mc. Poltaszewski 3', 13', 27'; Małecki 5'; Bieńkowski 12', 15'; Turij 30'	Report	Magnusson 17'; Taylor 21'; Tyne 29'

Umpires:
Maksym Perepelytsya (UKR)
Serap Yürükoğlu (TUR)

9 August 2026
09:00

Bulgaria	2–5	Slovakia
Antonov 7'; Milkovski 14'	Report	Nedeliak 5', 27'; Kajaba 11', 15'; Belošovič 20'

Umpires:
Maksym Perepelytsya (UKR)
Paula Slawinska (POL)

9 August 2026
10:00

Poland	3–5	Ukraine
Małecki 18'; Stotko 23'; Rataj 28'	Report	Kaplinskyi 1', 18'; Shevchuk 5'; Koshelenko 8'; Luppa 29'

Umpires:
Marcel Knakowski (GER)
Daniel Stewart (ENG)

9 August 2026
12:00

Sweden	3–4	Bulgaria
Lunde 16', 29', 29'	Report	Milkovski 2'; Vasilev 5', 26'; Lekov 8'

Umpires:
Marcel Knakowski (GER)
Paula Slawinska (POL)

9 August 2026
14:00

Slovakia	1–12	Poland
Kajaba 28'	Report	Rataj 2', 6', 10', 12', 15', 20', 22', 23'; Turij 4', 21', 25'; Ma. Poltaszewski 8'

Umpires:
Oleksandra Lynnyk (UKR)
Daniel Stewart (ENG)

9 August 2026
15:00

Ukraine	15–3	Sweden
Kaplinskyi 3', 7', 12', 13', 17', 18', 22', 27'; Solomianyi 4', 20', 24', 30'; Shevchuk 21'; Yasinskyi 23'; Boiko 25'	Report	Lunde 12', 15'; Taylor 24'

Umpires:
Lubos Kamendy (SVK)
Serap Yürükoğlu (TUR)

== Statistics ==
=== Final standings ===
Pos	Team
1st place, gold medalist(s)	Ukraine
2nd place, silver medalist(s)	Poland
3rd place, bronze medalist(s)	Sweden
4	Slovakia
5	Bulgaria

Source: FIH

=== Goalscorers ===
There were 237 goals scored in 20 matches, for an average of 11.8 goals per match.

30 goals

- (Ukraine) Volodymyr Kaplinskyi

28 goals

- (Poland) Waldemar Rataj

17 goals

- (Ukraine) Vitalii Shevchuk

14 goals

- (Ukraine) Andrii Koshelenko

12 goals

- (Sweden) Johannes Lunde

11 goals

- (Poland) Dominik Turij
- (Ukraine) Oleksandr Solomianyi

9 goals

- (Poland) Dominik Małecki
- (Slovakia) Matúš Kajaba

8 goals

- (Poland) Jakub Bieńkowski

7 goals

- (Bulgaria) Ivan Vasilev
- (Poland) Michal Poltaszewski

6 goals

- (Ukraine) Dmytro Luppa

5 goals

- (Poland) Mateusz Poltaszewski
- (Slovakia) Lubor Krajčir
- (Sweden) Max Taylor

4 goals

- (Poland) Mateusz Stotko
- (Slovakia) Richard Garaj
- (Slovakia) Matej Nedeliak
- (Sweden) Vilmer Karlsson
- (Ukraine) Oleksandr Boiko

3 goals

- (Bulgaria) Ventsislav Balev
- (Bulgaria) Daniel Lekov
- (Slovakia) Šimon Belošovič
- (Sweden) Tristan Tyne

2 goals

- (Bulgaria) Daniel Antonov
- (Bulgaria) Boris Milkovski
- (Poland) Jakub Mikołajczak
- (Slovakia) Michal Blazovsky
- (Sweden) Andries de Groen
- (Sweden) Dennis Haag
- (Sweden) Anders Magnusson
- (Sweden) Elias Rodewi
- (Ukraine) Volodymyr Kostechko

1 goal

- (Bulgaria) Anton Milkovski
- (Slovakia) Dominik Mišovič
- (Ukraine) Mykhailo Yasinskyi

Source: FIH

== See also ==
- 2026 Women's EuroHockey5s Championship
