= 2024 Men's EuroHockey5s Championship =

Field hockey 5s tournament

Tournament details
- Host country: Poland
- City: Walcz
- Dates: 3–6 July
- Teams: 10 (from 1 confederation)
- Venue: Centralny Ośrodek

Final positions
- Champions: Poland (1st title)
- Runner-up: Ukraine
- Third place: Switzerland

Tournament statistics
- Matches played: 29
- Goals scored: 371 (12.79 per match)
- Top scorer: Four Players (15 goals)

The 2024 Men's EuroHockey5s Championship is the second edition of the Men's EuroHockey5s Championship. It was held at the same time as the women's tournament in Walcz, Poland, from 6 to 9 July 2024.

== Teams ==
- Cyprus
- Czech Republic
- Finland
- Italy
- Lithuania
- Poland
- Sweden
- Switzerland
- Turkey
- Ukraine

== Preliminary round ==
=== Pool A ===
Pos	Team	Pld	W	D	L	GF	GA	GD	Pts	Qualification
1	Poland (H)	4	4	0	0	48	10	+38	12	Semi-Finals
2	Italy	4	2	1	1	31	21	+10	7	Semi-Finals
3	Türkiye	4	2	1	1	29	20	+9	7	5–8th place semi-finals
4	Czechia	4	1	0	3	19	34	−15	3	5–8th place semi-finals
5	Cyprus	4	0	0	4	9	51	−42	0	9/10th place game

Source: FIH
Rules for classification: 1) points; 2) matches won; 3) goal difference; 4) goals for; 5) head-to-head result; 6) field goals for.
(H) Hosts

3 July 2024
11:20

Türkiye	7–3	Czechia
	Report

3 July 2024
12:00

Cyprus	1–11	Italy
	Report

3 July 2024
16:20

Türkiye	6–6	Italy
	Report

3 July 2024
17:00

Poland	11–1	Czechia
	Report

4 July 2024
13:00

Italy	10–4	Czechia
	Report

4 July 2024
13:40

Cyprus	0–18	Poland
	Report

4 July 2024
19:00

Czechia	11–6	Cyprus
	Report

4 July 2024
19:40

Türkiye	5–9	Poland
	Report

5 July 2024
10:20

Cyprus	2–11	Türkiye
	Report

5 July 2024
11:00

Poland	10–4	Italy
	Report

=== Pool B ===
Pos	Team	Pld	W	D	L	GF	GA	GD	Pts	Qualification
1	Ukraine	4	3	1	0	50	17	+33	10	Semi-Finals
2	Switzerland	4	2	2	0	38	20	+18	8	Semi-Finals
3	Lithuania	4	2	1	1	32	19	+13	7	5–8th place semi-finals
4	Sweden	4	1	0	3	8	38	−30	3	5–8th place semi-finals
5	Finland	4	0	0	4	15	49	−34	0	9/10th place game

Source: FIH
Rules for classification: 1) points; 2) matches won; 3) goal difference; 4) goals for; 5) head-to-head result; 6) field goals for.

3 July 2024
10:00

Ukraine	8–4	Lithuania
	Report

3 July 2024
10:40

Finland	3–4	Sweden
	Report

3 July 2024
15:00

Switzerland	7–7	Lithuania
	Report

3 July 2024
15:40

Ukraine	16–3	Sweden
	Report

4 July 2024
11:40

Sweden	0–8	Lithuania
	Report

4 July 2024
12:20

Finland	5–13	Switzerland
	Report

4 July 2024
17:40

Lithuania	13–4	Finland
	Report

4 July 2024
18:20

Ukraine	7–7	Switzerland
	Report

5 July 2024
09:00

Switzerland	11–1	Sweden
	Report

5 July 2024
09:40

Finland	3–19	Ukraine
	Report

== Ninth and tenth place ==
5 July 2024
19:30

Cyprus	3–4	Finland
	Report

== Fifth to eighth place classification ==
=== Bracket ===
Cross-overs
5 July
Türkiye	13
Sweden	6
5 July
Lithuania	1
Czechia	14

Fifth place
6 July
Türkiye	5
Czechia	8
Seventh place
6 July
Sweden	4
Lithuania	5

==== Cross-overs ====
5 July 2024
15:00

Lithuania	1–14	Czechia
	Report

5 July 2024
16:30

Türkiye	13–6	Sweden
	Report

=== 7th/8th place game ===
6 July 2024
08:30

Sweden	4–5	Lithuania
	Report

=== 5th/6th place game ===
6 July 2024
11:30

Türkiye	5–8	Czechia
	Report

== First to fourth place classification ==
Semi-finals
5 July
Poland	6
Switzerland	3
5 July
Ukraine	8
Italy	3

Final
6 July
Poland	3
Ukraine	2
Third place
6 July
Switzerland (pen.)	2 (3)
Italy	2 (2)

=== Semi-finals ===
5 July 2024
15:45

Poland	6–3	Switzerland
	Report

5 July 2024
17:15

Ukraine	8–3	Italy
	Report

=== Third place game ===
6 July 2024
09:15

Switzerland	2–2	Italy
	Report
Penalties
	3–2

=== Final ===
6 July 2024
13:45

Poland	3–2	Ukraine
	Report

== Final standing ==
Rank	Team
1st place, gold medalist(s)	Poland
2nd place, silver medalist(s)	Ukraine
3rd place, bronze medalist(s)	Switzerland
4	Italy
5	Czech Republic
6	Turkey
7	Lithuania
8	Sweden
9	Finland
10	Cyprus
