= Robert Strąk =

Polish politician

member of Sejm 2005-2007
- In office 25 September 2005 – 2007

Personal details
- Born: 1967 (age 58–59)
- Party: League of Polish Families

Robert Strąk (born 9 June 1967 in Wałcz) is a Polish politician. He was elected to the Sejm on 25 September 2005, getting 13,859 votes in 26 Gdynia district as a candidate from the League of Polish Families list.

He was also a member of Sejm 2001-2005.

== See also ==
- Members of Polish Sejm 2005-2007
