= Vanja Vukovic =

German fine-art photographer and photo-designer

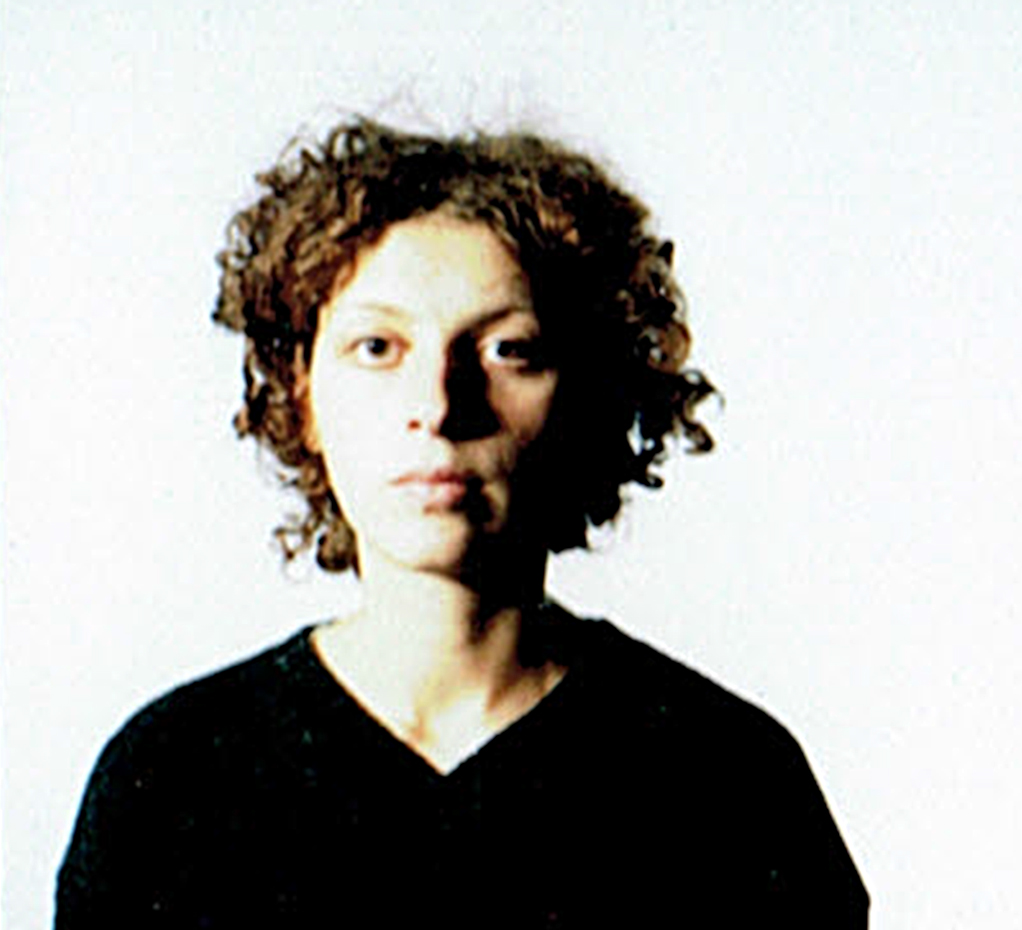
Portrait of Vanja Vukovic

Vanja Vukovic (born 1971 in Montenegro) is a fine-art photographer and photo-designer living in Germany.

== Life and career ==
At the age of four, Vukovic moved with her family from Montenegro to Germany with her family, and has lived ever since in Frankfurt am Main. Outside Germany, she has executed projects in the US, Canada, China, Poland, Serbia, Kosovo, Montenegro, Bosnia and Hungary. She has done advertising photography for many organisations, including Publicis, Schweppes, Renault, Bankhaus Metzler, Dewey & LeBoeuf, Deutsche Bahn and Young & Rubicam. She does photojournalism for a variety of publications, including Stern, Chrismon and 11 Freunde.

From 1994 to 2000 she studied communications design at the Fachhochschule Darmstadt, in the Design and Photography department, graduating with a diploma. During her studies at Darmstadt, in 1997 and 1998, she spent a semester abroad at the University of Portsmouth, Great Britain, in the Department of Media Arts, Photography. Later, in a postgraduate course, she studied fine arts with Martha Rosler and Wolfgang Tillmans at the State Academy of Fine Arts, Städelschule Frankfurt.

She has won several prizes, among others an award at the fifth Aenne-Biermann-Preis and as finalist at the Golden Award of Montreux in 2007.

Vucovic is a member of the Deutscher Künstlerbund. Since 2010 she has also worked in the medium of Video.

== Projects ==
=== Eat your words ===
Urban life seems to consist of infinite possibilities and open spaces. Everyday life, however, consists of routine and habits. The enchantment that is hidden in every encounter and every scene often remains undiscovered. My current work intends to evoke those sudden brief moments of strangeness and enchantment once more. Fantasy, dreams, seconds of irrationality are provoked by the artificial addition of objects such as balloons, sheets of paper, and clouds – seemingly familiar objects from the history of art and the contemporary of art. Something is recognized and becomes unrecognisable at the same moment.

A scientific study of this series was applied to the enchantment. The first six images were examined by the Max Planck Institute in Tübingen using eye tracking. Eye tracking is a scientific method for capturing the perception of images by the viewer through analysis of eye movements. It poses some interesting questions about the effect of images. Is it possible to construct an optimal image for the viewer, and above all, what effect does it have? Picture number seven was created based on the evaluation. The result was the "perfect" picture.

=== I am your Camera my Dear ===
In the campaign "I am your Camera my Dear" as part of the project "Playing the City" by the Schirn Kunsthalle, three bodyguards in black suits, dark sunglasses and walkie-talkies accompanied random passers-by in downtown Frankfurt until they were noticed, giving different reactions: Depending on whether the situation was experienced as threatening or pleasant, the person being followed either fled from the bodyguards or enjoyed the attention given to them. The work raised the question: How much private space is public and how much public space is private? Where and how is the interface between private and public space generated?

=== Plastic Invader ===
In the photo series "Plastic Invader", which was mainly created in Shanghai in the summer of 2012, Vukovic searched for the traces of a grown and growing city in China. In doing so, she was able to document urban developments, sometimes in extreme dimensions. Ever larger, more extensive and extremely dense buildings being built without consideration of natural rhythms, whether of the inhabitants or the environment. Nature is displaced by plastic, by artificial things and buildings: an invasion of the plastic, the artificial, the non-natural. But nature also pushes the city back in places: trees, reeds and weeds form green islands in the concreted city.

=== Safe Heaven ===
In her 2010 series "Safe Heaven", Vukovic presents night photographs taken in front of the refugee shelter in Schöppingen. The nameless refugees are depicted like ghosts trying to escape from the artificially lit room. During her artist-in-residence stay in the artists' village of Schöppingen, Vanja Vukovic often talked to the people in the refugee home, learned a lot from them and gained their trust. Her pictures show the sensitivity of the artist and the photographed. Matthias Ulrich, the curator of the Schirn Kunsthalle, commented on the refugees depicted in the photo series: "Whether they will ever reach a secure heaven, however, and whether they will ever be able to write down a continuation of their story in a new home is another story."

== Fellowships ==
- Artist in Residence, Künstlerdorf Schöppingen, 2009
- Artist in Residence, Kulturamt Frankfurt am Main, 2010.
- Utopia Parkway Ad-hoc-Residence, Stuttgart
- Artist in Residence, Swatch Art Peace Hotel, Shanghai, China, 2012.

== Exhibitions (selected) ==
- Fifth Aenne-Biermann-Prize, Museum for applied art, Gera, group exhibition, 2001.
- "Humankapital" (Human Capital), Schloßgartencafe, Darmstadt, group exhibition, 2005.
- "Tyurangalila", Holler & Jacobs, Gießen, individual exhibition, 2007.
- "Der bloße Mensch" (the bare person), Gallery Standort Höchst, Frankfurt, group exhibition, 2007.
- "Sommerschau" Basis Frankfurt, group exhibition, 2008.
- "Ich ist ein Raum" (I is a room), 1822-Forum of the Frankfurter Sparkasse, individual exhibition, 2008.
- "Ich ist ein Raum" Kunstradar Düsseldorf, individual exhibition, 2009.
- "Das Leben ist eine Kunst" Bahnhofsmission Frankfurt, group exhibition, 2009.
- "New to the Eye", artMbassy, Berlin, group exhibition, 2009.
- "Brixton Salon", Viewfinder Photography Gallery, London, England, group exhibition, 2010.
- "Playing the city", Schirn Kunsthalle, Frankfurt, group exhibition, 2010.
- "Die Frage nach der Zukunft der Kunst in unserer Gesellschaft" (The question of the future of Art in our society), Württembergischer Kunstverein, Stuttgart, group exhibition, 2011.
- "100-Tage-Kunst" (100-day-art), Ballhaus, Düsseldorf, group exhibition, 2011.
- Galerie Denkpause, Hamburg, individual exhibition, 2011.
- Künstlerhaus Stuttgart, Artist Talk, 2011.
- Ex-Fellows "Geist ist Geil" (ghost is horny), Schöppingen, group exhibition, 2011.
- "Leistungsschau" (achievement exhibition), Kunsthalle Hamburger Platz, Berlin, group exhibition, 2011.
- "Ansichtssachen" (points of view), district initiative Koblenzer Straße, Frankfurt, group exhibition, 2011.
- "42, Safe Heaven", Perpetuel, Frankfurt, individual exhibition, 2011.
- "Gesichtsverlust" (loss of face), Kunstverein Viernheim, group exhibition 2012.
- Souvenir Frankfurt, Frankfurt, individual exhibition 2012.
- "Von Zuneigung und anderen (zwischen)menschlichen Affekten" (on affection and other (inter)human affects), 25 pictures/second, Mannheim, group exhibition 2012.
- "mein atelier – my studio", Stuttgarter Kunstverein, group exhibition, 2012.
- Galerie 143, Dortmund, individual exhibition, 2012.
- "Martha Rosler – Vanja Vukovic", Kunstverein Eulengasse, Frankfurt, individual exhibition, 2013.
- Video tour at the 60th International Short Film Festival Oberhausen, 2014
- VANJA VUKOVIC - THE DARK SIDES OF SPARKLING, Young Museum Bottrop, Solo show, 2015
- This is not a love song... - Vanja Vukovic, Parkhaus WK 16, Frankfurt am Main, Solo show, 2016
- The dark sides of sparkling, Athens Photo Festival APhF:17 "Still Searching", group show, 2017
- AOIO5S - Attention on interests of 5 subjects, Basis Projektraum Frankfurt, group show, 2018
- Vanja Vukovic - Kunstverein Linz am Rhein, Solo show, 2019

== Publications ==
- "The dark sides of sparkling". Volume 1, Edition Faust, ISBN 978-3-945400-25-8.
- with Matthias Göritz: "Shanghai Blues". Volume 1, Edition Faust, ISBN 978-3-945400-15-9.
- with Guido Rohm: "Safe Heaven". Volume 2, Edition Faust, ISBN 978-3-938783-73-3.
- "Ich ist ein Raum I. - VI.: 01. July bis 02 August 2008." To mark the exhibition "Ich ist ein Raum" at the 1822-Forum der Frankfurter Sparkasse.
