= Wałcz =

Town in the West Pomeranian Voivodeship, Poland

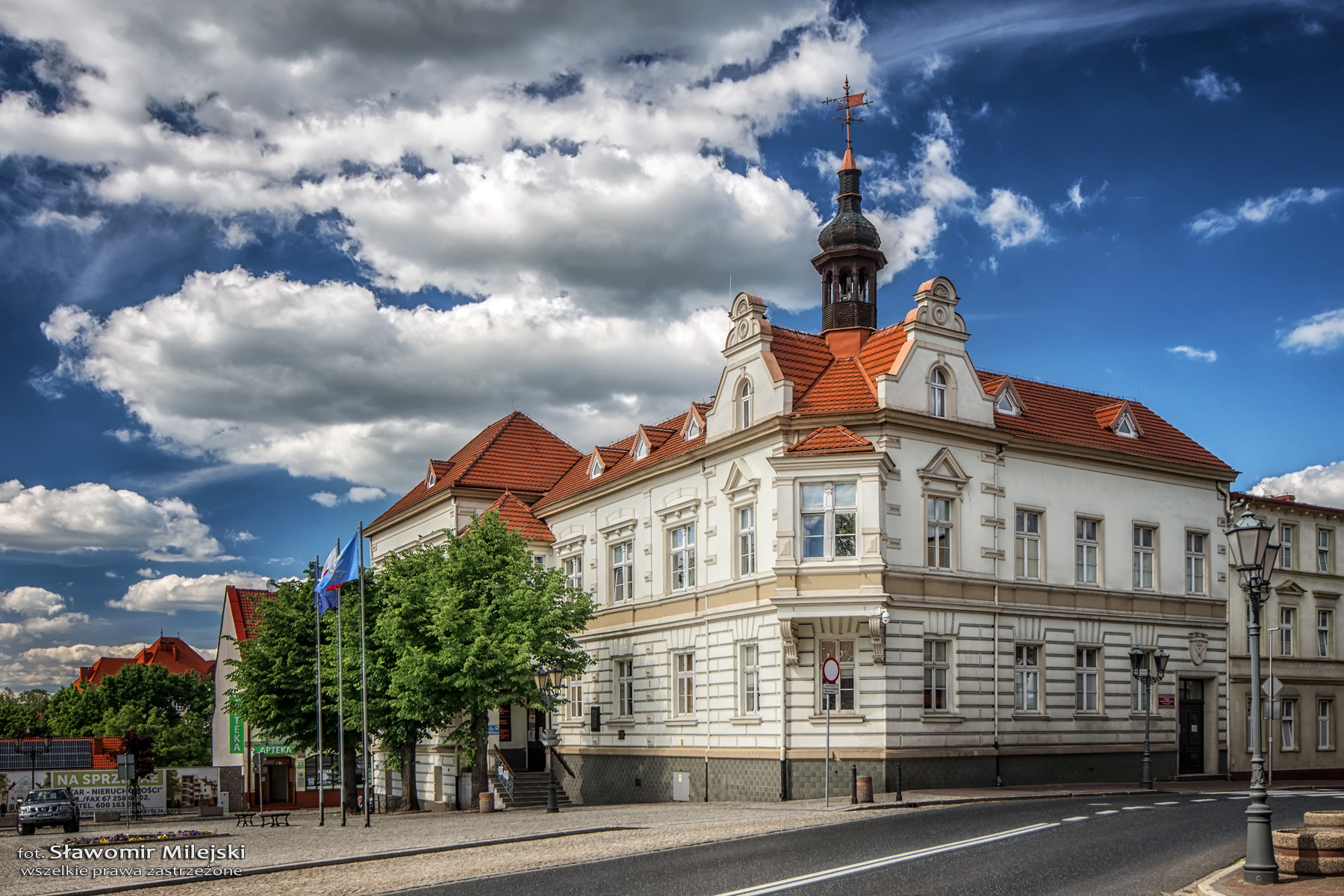
- Town Hall

- Flag Coat of arms

- Location within Poland
- Coordinates: 53°16′N 16°28′E
- Country: Poland
- Voivodeship: West Pomeranian
- County: Wałcz
- Gmina: Wałcz (urban gmina)
- Town rights: 1303

Government
  - Mayor: Maciej Żebrowski

Area
  - Total: 38.16 km^{2} (14.73 sq mi)
- Elevation: 109 m (358 ft)

Population (2020)
  - Total: 24,949
  - Density: 653.8/km^{2} (1,693/sq mi)
- Time zone: UTC+1 (CET)
  - Summer (DST): UTC+2 (CEST)
- Postal code: 78-600
- Area code: +48 67
- Car plates: ZWA
- Climate: Dfb
- Website: walcz.pl

Wałcz (Polish pronunciation: [vau̯t͡ʂ]; German: Deutsch Krone) is a county town in Wałcz County of the West Pomeranian Voivodeship in northwestern Poland.

Granted city rights in 1303, Wałcz has become the administrative, industrial and cultural center of the Wałcz Lake District with the city itself situated on the banks of the Raduń and Zamkowe lakes. Wałcz is located in the southestern portion of West Pomeranian Voivodeship. The closest cities are Szczecin 130 km (81 mi), Bydgoszcz 115 km (71 mi), Piła 26 km (16 mi), Poznań 120 km (75 mi), Gorzów Wielkopolski 107 km (66 mi) and Koszalin 120 km (75 mi).

Historically, the town belonged to the province of Greater Poland and was a royal city of Poland until the Partitions of Poland. Afterwards, from 1772 to 1945 it was part of Prussia and, from 1871 to 1945, it was also part of Germany, before being reintegrated with Poland. It is the location of one of the oldest high schools in Poland, founded over 350 years ago, and a garrison of the Polish Army.

== Geography ==
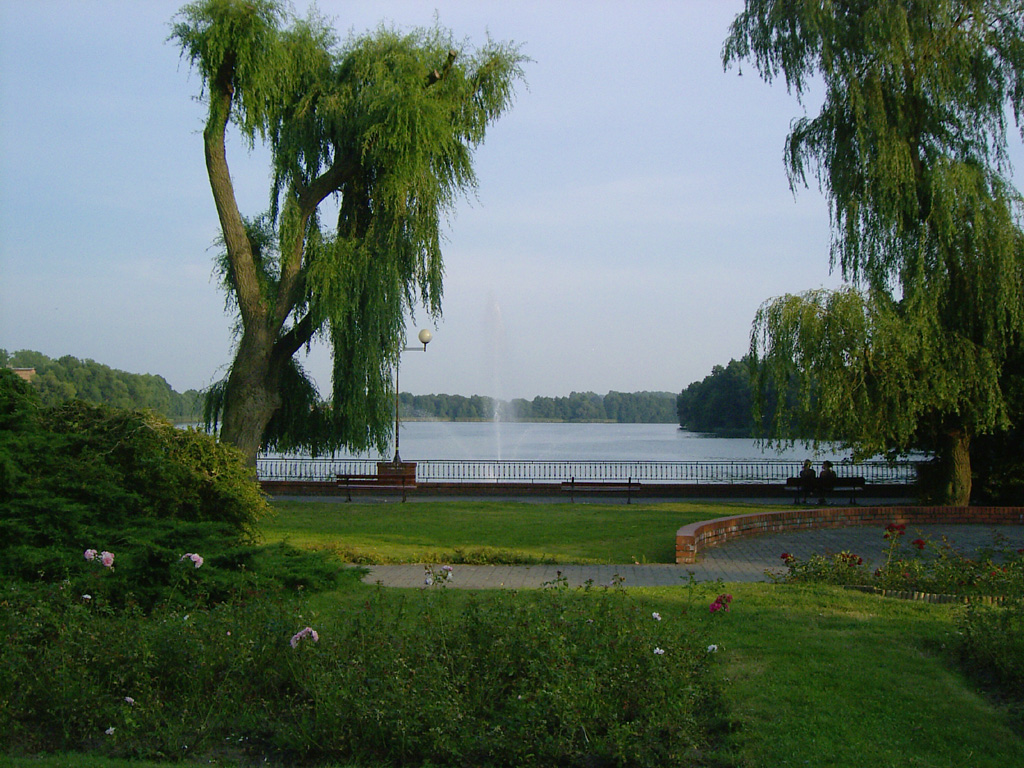
Lake Zamkowe, municipal park

According to a report from 2002, Wałcz has an area of 38.16 square kilometres (14.73 square miles) of which 41% is used for agriculture and 17% is forest.

There are two large lakes within the town limits: Raduń (area - 227.10 hectares (2.27 km^{2}; 0.88 sq mi), length - 6,050 m (19,850 ft), shoreline - over 19,000 m (62,000 ft), maximum depth - 25.6 m (84 ft), average depth - 10.4 m (34 ft)) and Zamkowe (area - 129.57 hectares (1.30 km^{2}; 0.50 sq mi), length - 3,350 m (10,990 ft), shoreline - over 10,950 m (35,930 ft), maximum depth - 41 m (135 ft), average depth - 12.9 m (42 ft)). There are also four smaller lakes within the town limits: Cegielnia, Chmiel Duży, Chmiel Mały, Raduń Mały, and several more within a short distance of Wałcz, including Ostrowiec Wielki, Łubianka, Łabędzie. Lake Raduń is spanned by the Kłosowski suspension bridge.

The town occupies 2.17% of the total area of Wałcz county.

== History ==
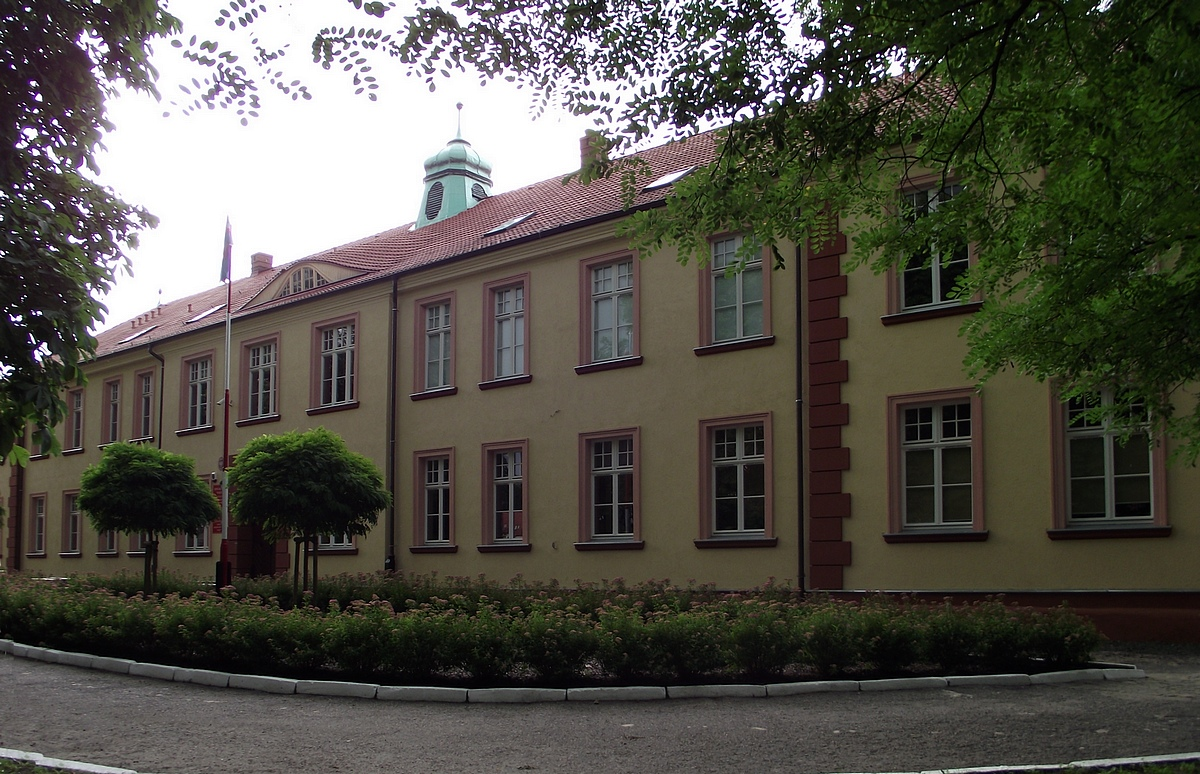
Former Jesuit College, today's I Liceum Ogólnokształcące

In the High Middle Ages the region of modern Wałcz was a boundary territory between Pomerania and Greater Poland. It was included within the emerging Polish state in the late 10th century, and was integrated into the Kingdom of Poland again in the early 12th century. Later, as a result of the fragmentation of Poland, it became part of the Duchy of Greater Poland. Except for a brief period of Brandenburg rule (in the 14th century), it remained part of Poland until the first partition in 1772. After the town was recovered by King Casimir III the Great in 1368, it was a royal town and county seat, administratively located in the Poznań Voivodeship of the Greater Poland Province. In 1618 Jan Gostomski, starost of Wałcz, brought the Jesuits to the town, who founded the Jesuit College, nicknamed the "Wałcz Athens", in the 1660s, which as today's I Liceum Ogólnokształcące im. Kazimierza Wielkiego, is one of the oldest high schools in northwestern Poland.

During Prussian and German rule, Wałcz was known by the newly given name Deutsch Krone. It was initially part of the Netze District, which while formally separate was ruled from the province of West Prussia after 1775; it formally became part of West Prussia following the 1807 Treaties of Tilsit which partitioned the Netze District. In 1781, the Jesuit College was transformed into a Royal Gymnasium, whose director was Józef Dalski. Lessons in Polish were held until 1831, when the school, similar to the town, was subjected to Germanisation. However, its director from 1866 to 1890 was a Pole, Antoni Łowiński. At that time, Polish lessons were restored as an optional, additional course for students, and a secret Polish youth philomath organization Ul operated in the school. Łowiński's gravestone at the local cemetery is the only one facing away from the main cemetery alley, because the German administration opposed using Latin inscriptions, instead of German. In 1831–1832, one of the main escape routes for insurgents of the Polish November Uprising from partitioned Poland to the Great Emigration led through the town.

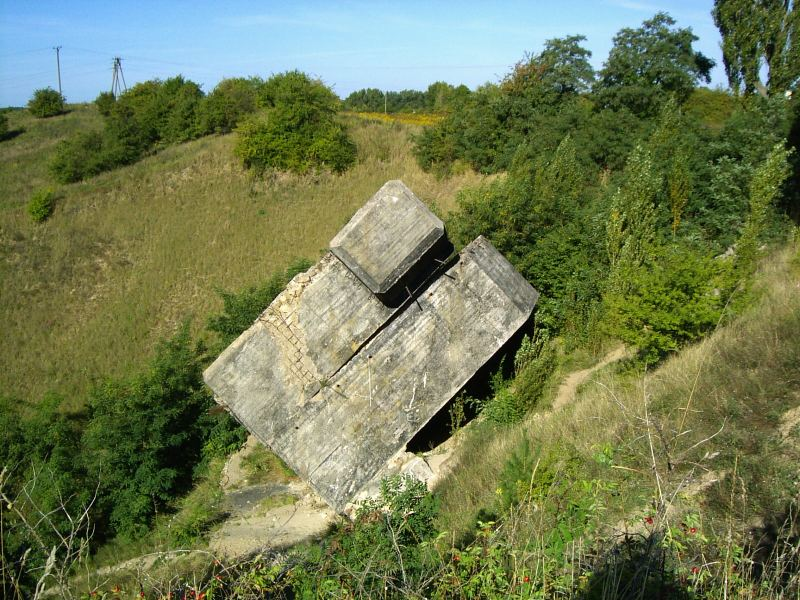
Remains of German pre-World War II border fortifications

After the First World War it was one of the few towns of historical Greater Poland that were not included in the borders of Poland after regaining independence in 1918. Deutsch Krone, having a predominantly German population, remained part of Weimar Germany and was part of the Posen-West Prussia province until 1938 when it was assigned to Pomerania. During World War II, the German administration operated a labor camp for French and American prisoners of war from the Stalag II-B prisoner-of-war camp in the town. The Polish resistance conducted espionage of German activity in the town. The town was occupied by the Red Army on 12 February 1945. After the end of World War II, the town became again part of Poland according to the Potsdam Conference and renamed to its historic name Wałcz. Also in accordance to the Potsdam Agreement, its German inhabitants were expropriated and expelled. The town was repopulated by Poles, most of whom were themselves expelled from the former eastern territories of Poland annexed by the Soviet Union.

Numerous pre-war ruins of German fortifications and bunkers are found in woods surrounding Wałcz, especially in proximity to the lakes. Most of them however are inaccessible – blown up or filled with soil, to prevent accidents with careless tourists.

From 1975 to 1998, the town was administratively part of the Piła Voivodeship.

The lack of heavy industry in Wałcz and the surrounding areas has helped the city to maintain relative ecological cleanliness and is an excellent location for rest and relaxation. It has a post office that was built during the reign of Napoleon.

== Sport ==
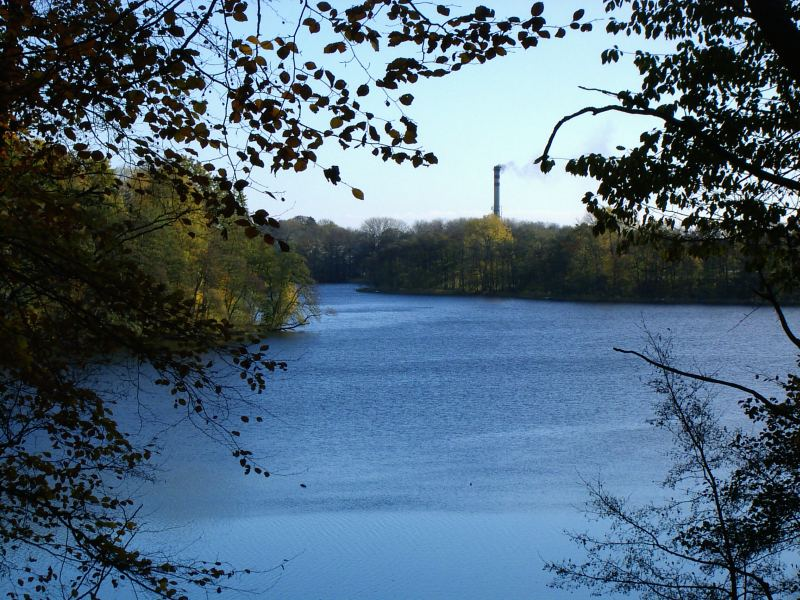
Lake Raduń view from beechwood forest

Next to the suspension bridge on Lake Raduń in a beechwood forest is an Olympic Training Facility, the 'Bukowina'. Immediately after World War II, Winand Osiński and Olympic coach Jan Mulak founded the training centre and began training with the Polish track and field teams who represented Poland during the 50s and 60s. Poland's Olympic kayak team trains here to this day.

On this lake is also the City Centre for Sport and Recreation (MOSiR - Miejski Ośrodek Sportu i Rekreacji) which makes a wide range of sporting equipment available, including motor boats, kayaks, water bikes and the leisure boat Delfin. The centre also serves as a starting point for numerous walking and biking trails as well as kayak excursions. The so-called Pętla Wałecka, a kayaking route that traverses six lakes begins here and ends at Lake Bytyń Wielki.

Situated on the shores of the lakes are numerous beaches, swimming areas, camping spots and sporting equipment rentals.

== Architecture ==
Architecture of Wałcz (examples)

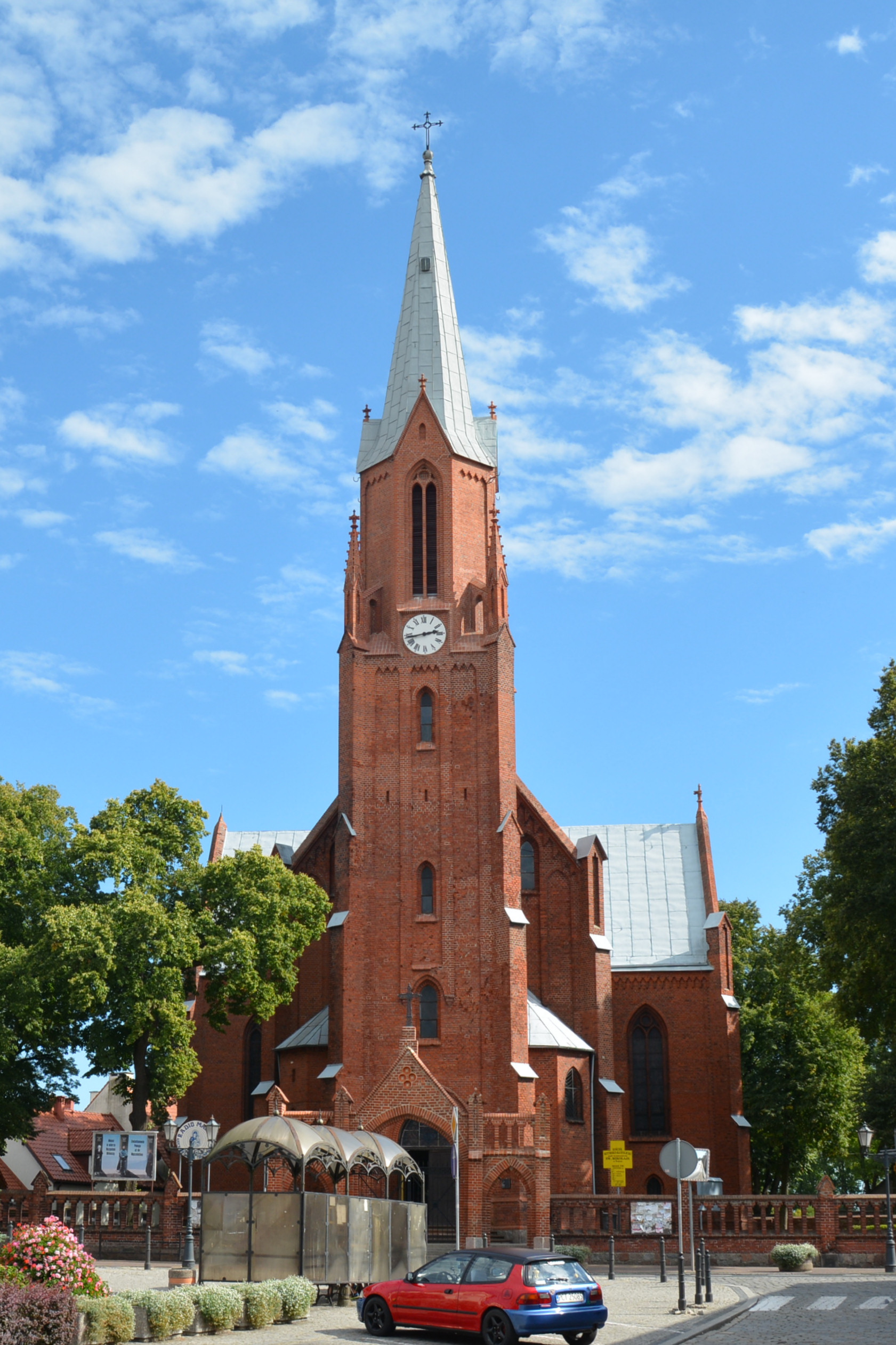
Saint Nicholas church

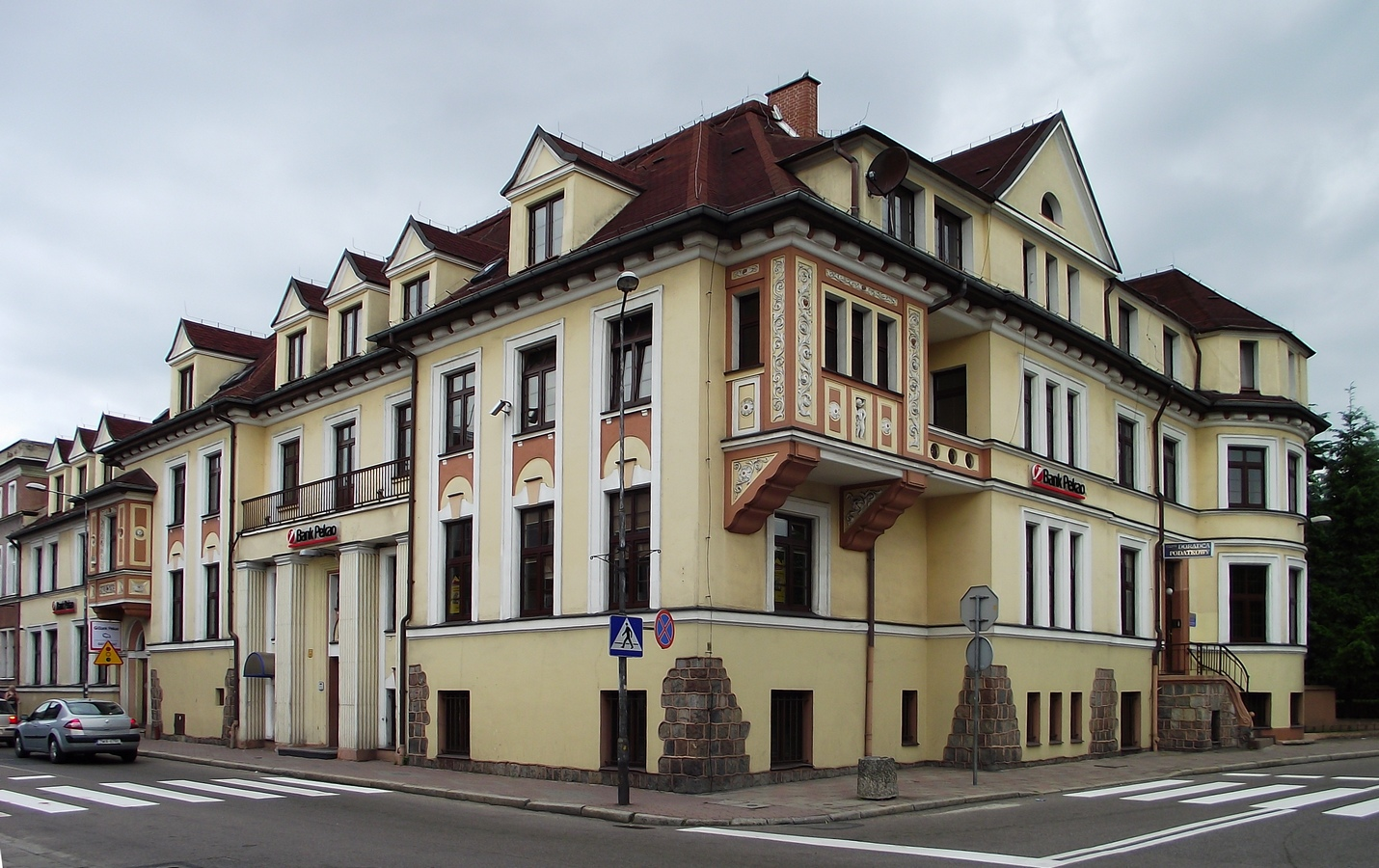
Historic bank building

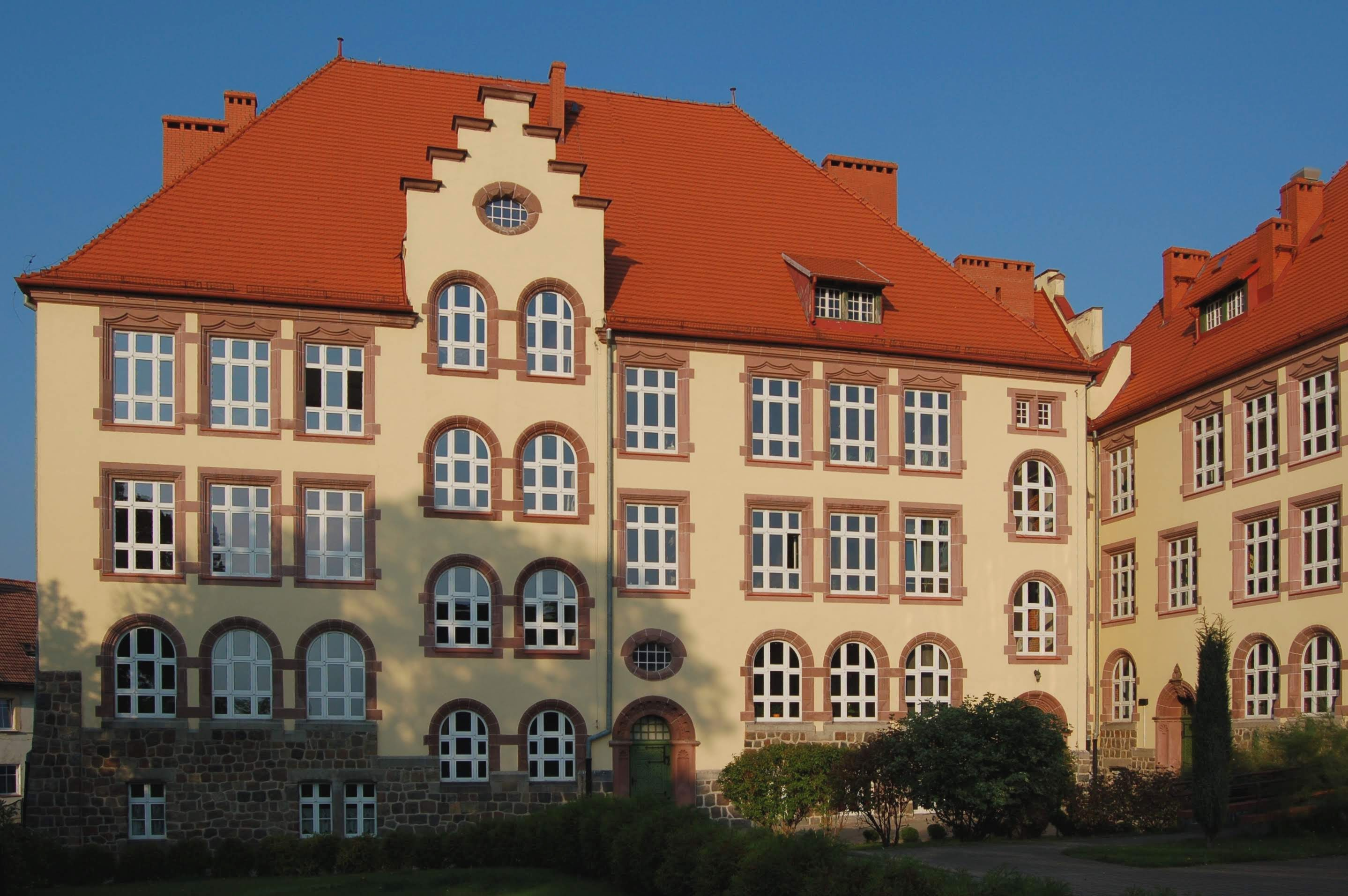
Elementary school no.2

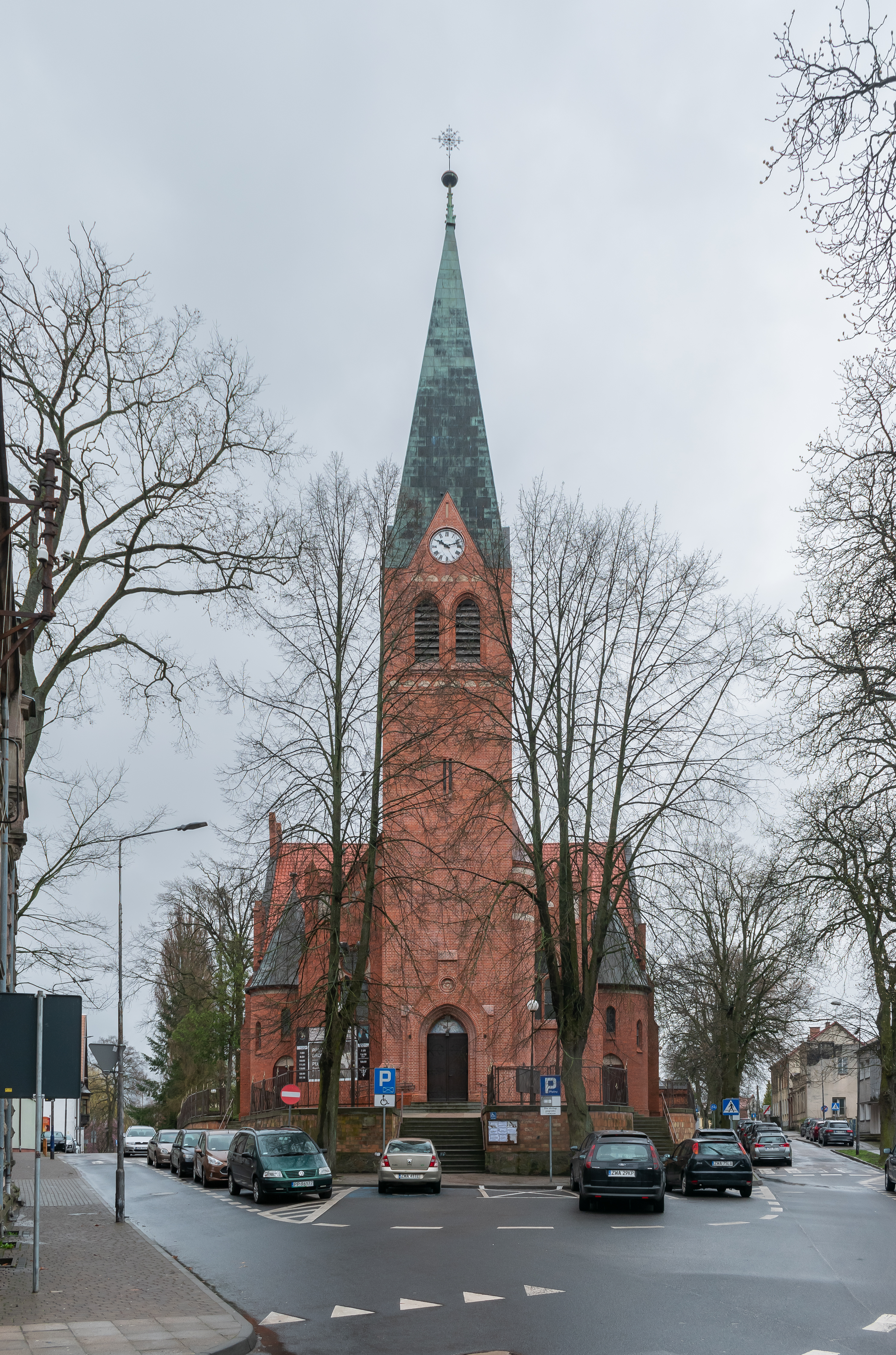
Saint Anthony church

Among the more important architectural sites in Wałcz:

- From the Middle Ages: market center, town hall in neo-Renaissance style.
- Court in classical style from the early 19th century next to the Wałcz Regional Museum (Muzeum Ziemi Wałeckiej)
- Saint Nicholas church (Kościół św. Mikołaja), Gothic Revival
- Saint Anthony church (Kościół św. Antoniego), Gothic Revival
- Main Post Office, Gothic Revival
- Former Jesuit College

== Climate ==
Climate in this area has mild differences between highs and lows, and there is adequate rainfall year-round. The Köppen Climate Classification subtype for this climate is "Cfb". (Marine West Coast Climate/Oceanic climate).

== Demographics ==
Demographics of Wałcz as of 2020 according to Statistics Poland:

	Total		Women		Men	
	individuals	%	individuals	%	individuals	%
Population	24,949	100	13,063	52.3	11,886	47.7
Density (persons/km^{2})	654					

In 2002, the average income per person was PZL 1,268.39.

Historical population

Year	Pop.	±%
1810	2,450	—
1849	4,180	+70.6%
1871	6,146	+47.0%
1880	6,568	+6.9%
1890	6,964	+6.0%

Year	Pop.	±%
1900	7,278	+4.5%
1910	7,673	+5.4%
1925	10,579	+37.9%
1939	14,941	+41.2%
1950	10,085	−32.5%

Year	Pop.	±%
1960	15,646	+55.1%
1980	22,800	+45.7%
2004	26,312	+15.4%
2016	25,749	−2.1%
2020	24,949	−3.1%

== Transport ==
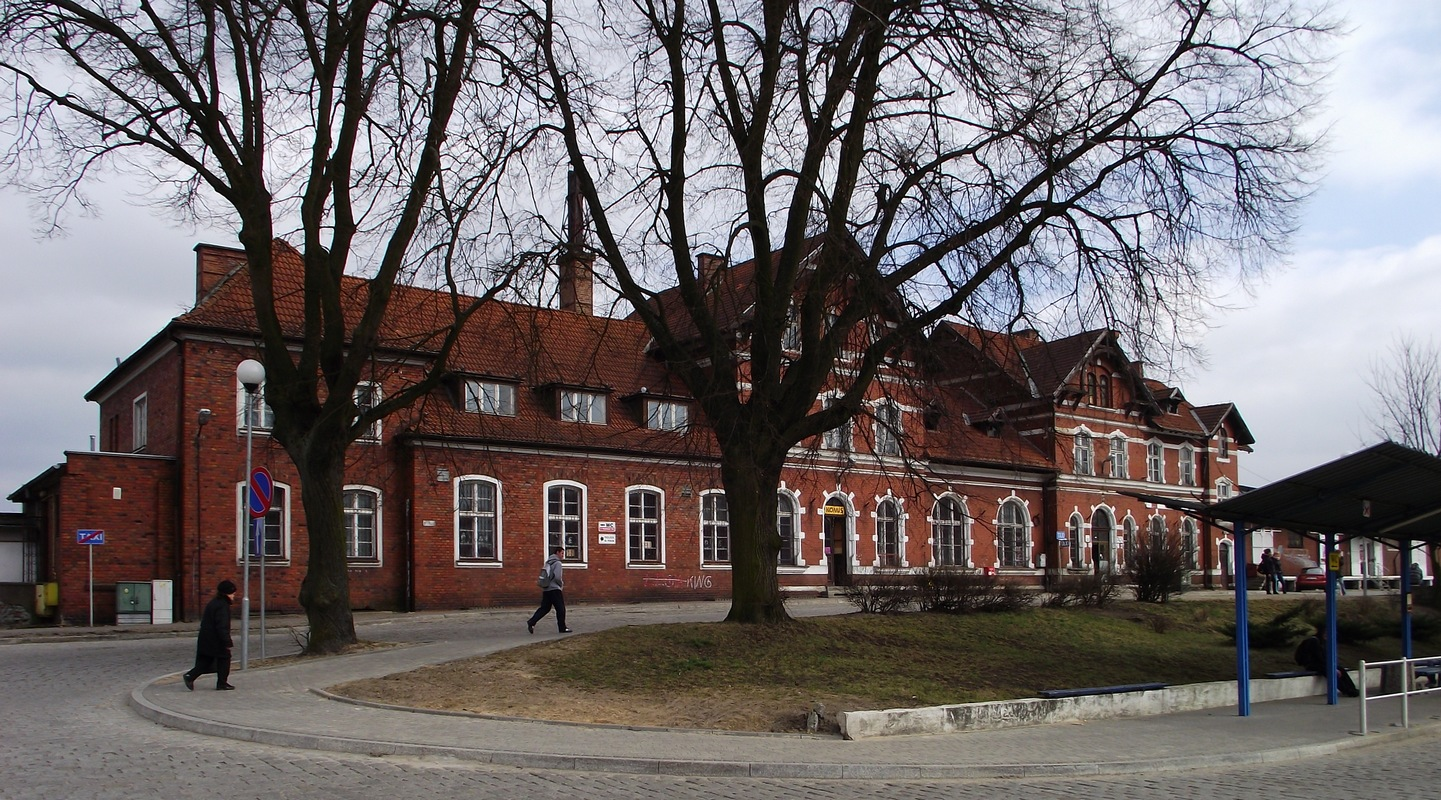
Wałcz train station

One national road goes through Wałcz: 22 from Kostrzyn nad Odrą to Braniewo. Regional roads 163 from Kołobrzeg and 178 to Oborniki also pass through. Rail service from Piła was renewed in 2007, while 3 other rail lines previously serving Wałcz have been discontinued. Bus service in the Wałcz region is provided by PKS Wałcz which also provides connections to Poznań, Szczecin, Bydgoszcz, Kołobrzeg and Gorzów Wielkopolski. Express bus services, KomfortBus, KSK Poznań, PKS Piła, PKS Szczecin, PKS Kołobrzeg and others also stop in Wałcz.

=== Local bus service ===
Local bus services are provided by ZKM (Zakład Komunikacji Miejskiej). There are 14 ZKM bus routes serving the city as well as several nearby towns and villages. Some of the bus lines are school-related and only run on school days.

== Notable residents ==
- Antoni Perzyński (born 1767), Polish priest and director of the Wałcz gymnasium
- Rudolph Wilde (1857–1910), local politician, mayor of Berlin-Schöneberg
- Ludwig Riess (1861–1928), German-born historian and educator, noted for his work in late 19th century Japan
- Friedrich-Carl von Steinkeller (1896–1981), Wehrmacht general
- Josef Rudnick (1917–2009), German businessman and CDU politician
- Marian Matłoka (1918–1986), Polish sprint canoer, competed in the 1948 Summer Olympics
- Godela Habel (1929–2022), German painter and artist
- Astrid Zydower (1929–2022), German-British sculptor
- Anna Bukis (born 1953), former Polish female athlete, competed in the 1980 Summer Olympics
- Grzegorz Kołtan (born 1955), Polish sprint canoer who competed the 1980 Summer Olympics
- Robert Strąk (born 1967), Polish politician, elected to the Sejm in 2005
- Mirosław Czech (born 1968), Polish politician and journalist, deputy of the Sejm II and III
- Tomasz Goliasz (born 1968), Polish sprint canoer, competed at the 1996 Summer Olympics
- Tadeusz Drzazga (born 1975), retired male weightlifter, competed the 2004 Summer Olympics
- Joanna Piwowarska (born 1983), Polish pole vaulter, competed at the 2008 Summer Olympics
- Łukasz Woszczyński (born 1983), Polish sprint canoer, competed at the 2004 Summer Olympics
- Krzysztof Głowacki (born 1986), Polish professional boxer
- Michał Kubiak (born 1988), Polish volleyball player, a member of Polish national team and World Champion

== Twin towns and sister cities ==
Wałcz is twinned with:

Åstorp, Sweden; Bad Essen, Germany	Demmin, Germany; Kyritz, Germany	Werne, Germany; Bailleul, France
