= Gola =

Gola may refer to:

== People ==
- Gola (surname)
- Gölä (born 1968), Swiss rock musician
- Gola, nickname for former Chelsea footballer Gianfranco Zola

=== Groups and tribes ===
- Gola language, the language of the Gola people
- Gola people, a tribal people in Liberia

== Geography ==
=== Poland ===
- Gola Dzierżoniowska in Lower Silesian Voivodeship (south-west Poland)
- Gola, Lubin County in Lower Silesian Voivodeship (south-west Poland)
- Gola, Trzebnica County in Lower Silesian Voivodeship (south-west Poland)
- Gola, Łódź Voivodeship (central Poland)
- Gola, Gostyń County in Greater Poland Voivodeship (west-central Poland)
- Gola, Gmina Rakoniewice, Grodzisk County in Greater Poland Voivodeship (west-central Poland)
- Gola, Jarocin County in Greater Poland Voivodeship (west-central Poland)
- Gola, Kępno County in Greater Poland Voivodeship (west-central Poland)
- Gola, Krosno County in Lubusz Voivodeship (west Poland)
- Gola, Gmina Sława in Lubusz Voivodeship (west Poland)
- Gola, Gmina Szlichtyngowa in Lubusz Voivodeship (west Poland)
- Gola, Namysłów County in Opole Voivodeship (south-west Poland)
- Goła, Olesno County in Opole Voivodeship (south-west Poland)

=== Elsewhere ===
- Gola, Koprivnica-Križevci County, a town in Croatia
- Gola (community development block), Jharkhand, India
- Gola, Ramgarh, a village in Jharkhand, India
- Gola Gokarannath, a city in Uttar Pradesh, India
- Gola River, Uttarakhand, India
- Gola Island or Oileán Ghabhla, an island off the coast of County Donegal, Ireland
- Gola, Nepal
- Gola Rainforest National Park, Sierra Leone

== Other ==
- Grand Orange Lodge of Australia
- Grand Orange Lodge of Africa
- Gola (brand), a British sporting goods manufacturer
- Gola in Hebrew refers to the Jewish diaspora
- Ice gola, a type of ice treat in Southern Asia

== See also ==
- Golla (disambiguation)
- Golay (disambiguation)
