= Fraustadt (district) =

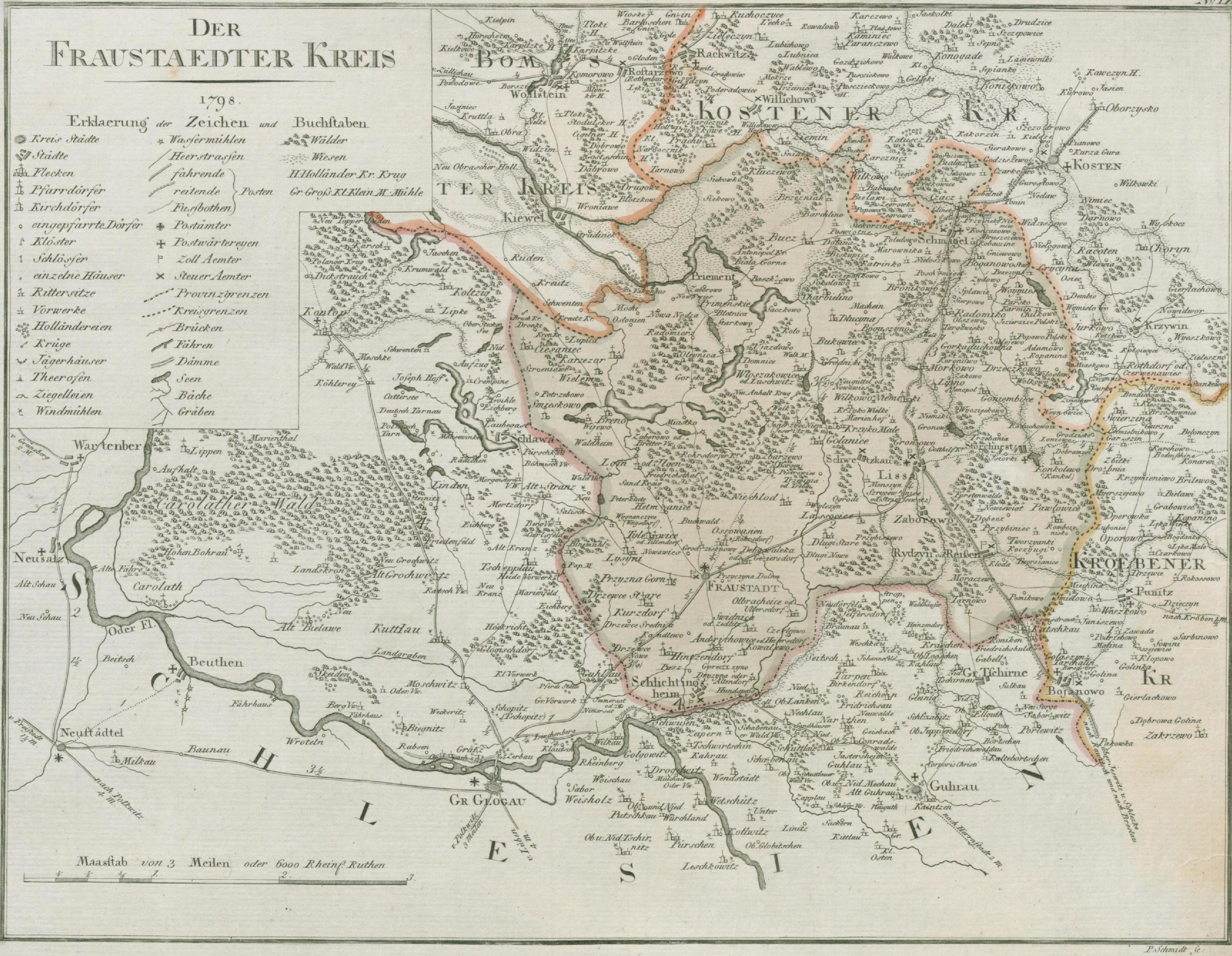
Fraustadt district in South Prussia

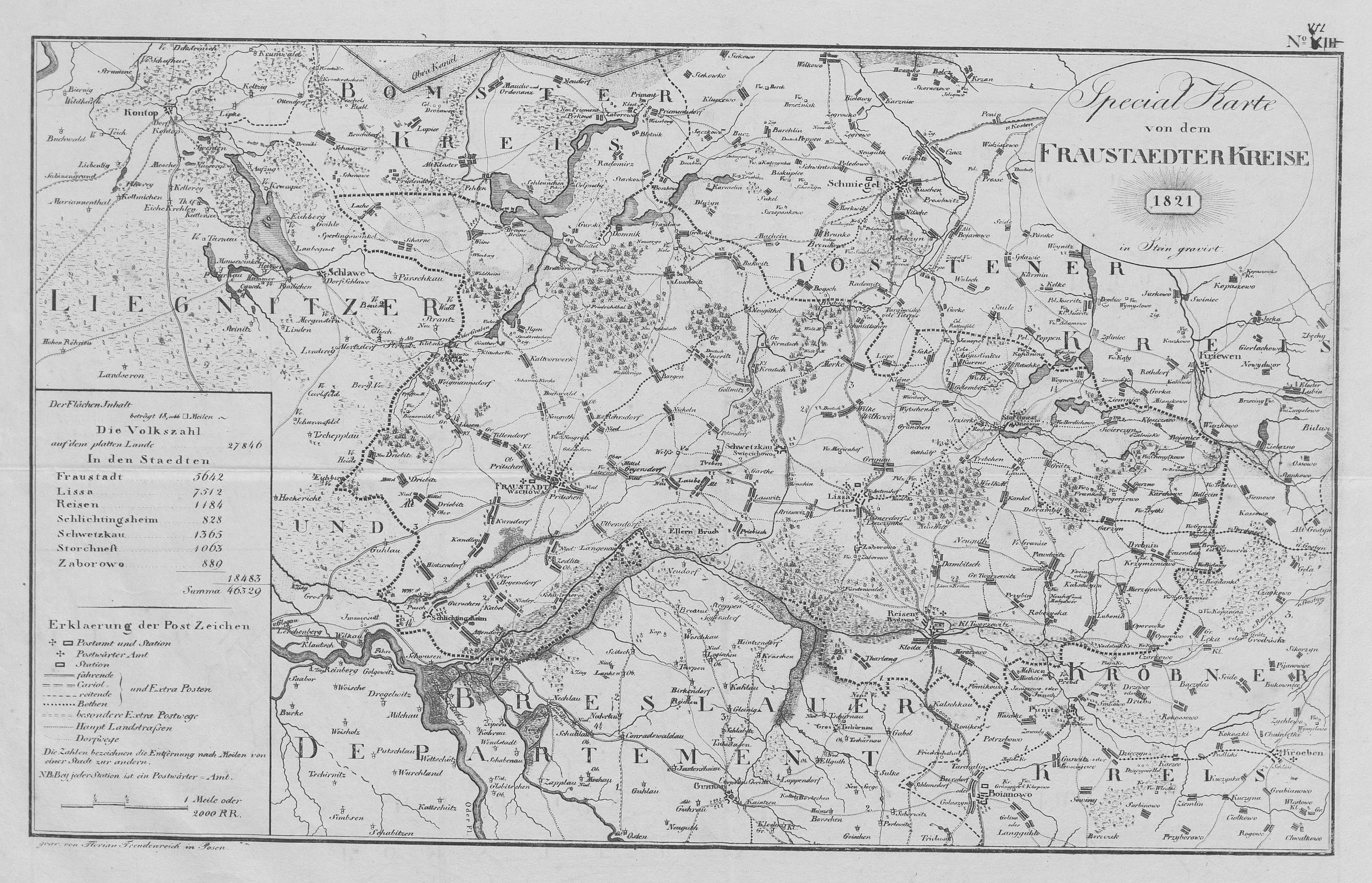
Fraustadt district (1818-1887)

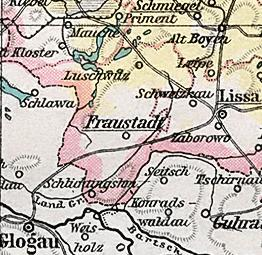
Fraustadt district (1887-1920)

Location of the Fraustadt district (1910)

The Fraustadt district (German: Kreis Fraustadt; 1939-1945: Landkreis Fraustadt) was a Prussian district which existed in various borders from 1793 to 1945. From 1793 to 1807, it was located in the Province of South Prussia, from 1815 to 1848 in the Grand Duchy of Posen, from 1848 to 1920 in the Province of Posen, from 1922 to 1938, in the Province of Posen-West Prussia, from 1938 to 1941 in the Province of Silesia, and from 1941 to 1945 in the Province of Lower Silesia.

== Size ==
The Fraustadt district had an area of

- 1,002 km^{2} (1818-1887)
- 477 km^{2} (1887-1920)
- 262 km^{2} (1920-1938).

Location of the Fraustadt district in the province of Grenzmark Posen-West Prussia (1922–1938)

== History ==
After the Second Partition of Poland, from 1793 to 1807, the area around Fraustadt and Lissa belonged to the Fraustadt district in the Prussian province of South Prussia. By the Treaty of Tilsit in 1807, the district was ceded to the Duchy of Warsaw. After the Congress of Vienna, on May 15, 1815, the district was restored to the Kingdom of Prussia and became part of the Grand Duchy of Posen, which became the Prussian Province of Posen in 1848.

During the Prussian administrative reforms, a district reform was carried out in the Posen administrative region on January 1, 1818, during which the area around the town of Schmiegel was transferred from the Fraustadt district to the Kosten district and the area around Priment was transferred to the Bomst district. The seat of the district office was Fraustadt. As part of the Province of Posen, the Fraustadt district became part of the newly founded German Reich on January 18, 1871. On October 1, 1887, a separate Lissa district was formed from the eastern part of the Fraustadt district, including Lissa, Schwetzkau, Reisen and Storchnest.

On December 27, 1918, the Greater Poland uprising against German rule began in the province of Posen, but the Fraustadt district, which was predominantly inhabited by Germans, remained under German control. On February 16, 1919, an armistice ended the Polish-German fighting, and on June 28, 1919, the German government, with the signing of the Treaty of Versailles, ceded the north-eastern part of the Fraustadt district (215 km^{2}) to the newly founded Second Polish Republic. On November 25, 1919, Germany and Poland concluded an agreement on the evacuation and surrender of the areas to be ceded, which was ratified on January 10, 1920. The evacuation and handover to Poland took place between January 17 and February 4, 1920. From November 20, 1919, the Fraustadt district was administered from Schneidemühl and belonged to the newly formed Prussian province of Posen-West Prussia from 1922.

On October 1, 1938, the province of Grenzmark Posen-West Prussia was dissolved and the Fraustadt district was assigned to the Liegnitz region of the Province of Silesia. The community of Lache was transferred to the neighboring district of Grünberg. On January 18, 1941, the province of Silesia was divided and the Fraustadt district now belonged to the Province of Lower Silesia. At the end of January 1945, the Red Army captured the Fraustadt district, after which it became part of Poland.

== Demographics ==
Ethnolinguistic structure of Kreis Fraustadt
| Year | Population | German | | Polish / Bilingual | |
|---|---|---|---|---|---|
| 1900 | 28,086 | 20,203 | 71.9% | 7,873 | 28.0% |
| 1905 | 28,219 | 19,812 | 70.2% | 8,393 | 29.7% |
| 1910 | 28,914 | 19,663 | 68.0% | 9,239 | 32.0% |

== Elections ==
In the German Empire, the Fraustadt district together with the Lissa district formed the Posen 6 Reichstag constituency. In the Reichstag elections between 1871 and 1912, the following members were elected:

- 1871:Maximilian von Puttkamer, National Liberal Party
- 1874:Maximilian von Puttkamer, National Liberal Party
- 1877:Maximilian von Puttkamer, National Liberal Party
- 1878:Maximilian von Puttkamer, National Liberal Party
- 1881:Stanislaus von Chlapowski, Polish Party
- 1884:Paul von Rheinbaben, Free Conservative Party
- 1887:Paul von Rheinbaben, Free Conservative Party
- 1890:Hans von Hellmann, Free Conservative Party
- 1893:Stanislaus von Chlapowski, Polish Party
- 1898:Anton Tasch, Centre Party
- 1903:Karl Schmidt, Free Conservative Party
- 1907:Max Kolbe, Free Conservative Party
- 1912:Hans Georg von Oppersdorff, Centre Party

== Municipalities ==
From 1887 to 1920, the following communities belonged to the district:

- Alt Driebitz
- Attendorf
- Bargen
- Brenno
- Bukwitz
- Deutsch Jeseritz
- Domnik
- Fraustadt, town
- Geyersdorf
- Gollmitz
- Groß Kreutsch
- Grotnik
- Gurschen
- Heyersdorf
- Hinzendorf
- Ilgen
- Kabel
- Kaltvorwerk
- Kandlau
- Klein Kreutsch
- Kursdorf
- Lache
- Lindensee
- Lissen
- Luschwitz
- Mittel Neu Driebitz
- Neu Laube
- Neuguth bei Fraustadt
- Neugüthel
- Nicheln
- Nieder Pritschen
- Ober Pritschen
- Röhrsdorf
- Scharne
- Schlichtingsheim, town
- Städtel
- Tillendorf
- Ulbersdorf
- Weigmannsdorf
- Weine
- Wilhelmsruh
- Zedlitz
