= Krupka (disambiguation) =

Krupka is a town in the Czech Republic.

Krupka may also refer to:

- Krupka, Łódź Voivodeship, Poland
- Krupka (surname)

== See also ==
- Krupki, Belarus
