= Wiewiórka =

Wiewiórka may refer to:

- Wiewiórka, Łódź Voivodeship (central Poland)
- Wiewiórka, Subcarpathian Voivodeship (south-east Poland)
- Wiewiórka, Warmian-Masurian Voivodeship (north Poland)
