= Chobot =

Chobot may refer to:

== Places ==
- Chobot (Strakonice District), Czech Republic
- Chobot, Lesser Poland Voivodeship, south Poland
- Chobot, Łódź Voivodeship, central Poland
- Chobot, Masovian Voivodeship, east-central Poland

== People ==
- Emanuel Chobot (1881–1944), Polish politician
- Jessica Chobot (born 1977), American television personality
- Marián Chobot (born 1999), Slovak footballer
