= Gmina Bolesławiec =

Gmina Bolesławiec may refer to either of the following rural administrative districts in Poland:

- Gmina Bolesławiec, Lower Silesian Voivodeship
- Gmina Bolesławiec, Łódź Voivodeship
