= Golay =

Golay may refer to:

- Jeanne Golay (born 1962), bicycle professional
- Helen Golay (born 1931), American woman who murdered two homeless men for life insurance money
- Marcel J. E. Golay (1902–1989), mathematician, physicist and information theorist
- Dolphy (1928-2012), Filipino actor and comedian, used Golay as his screen name in 1944.

Several devices and systems were named after Marcel J. E. Golay:

- Golay cell, a detector for infrared spectroscopy
- Savitzky–Golay filter, a signal processing filter
- Binary Golay code, an error-correcting code
- Ternary Golay code, an error-correcting code

Places:

- Golay, Kutch, a village in Kutch, Gujarat, India

== See also ==
- Gola (disambiguation)
- Golay code (disambiguation)
