= Koziołek =

Koziołek may refer to the following places:

- Koziołek, Kuyavian-Pomeranian Voivodeship (north-central Poland)
- Koziołek, Łódź Voivodeship (central Poland)
- Koziołek, Masovian Voivodeship (east-central Poland)
