= Chroscin =

Chroscin may refer to:

- Chrościn, Masovian Voivodeship, Poland
- Chróścin, Łódź Voivodeship, Poland
