= Szlichtyngowa =

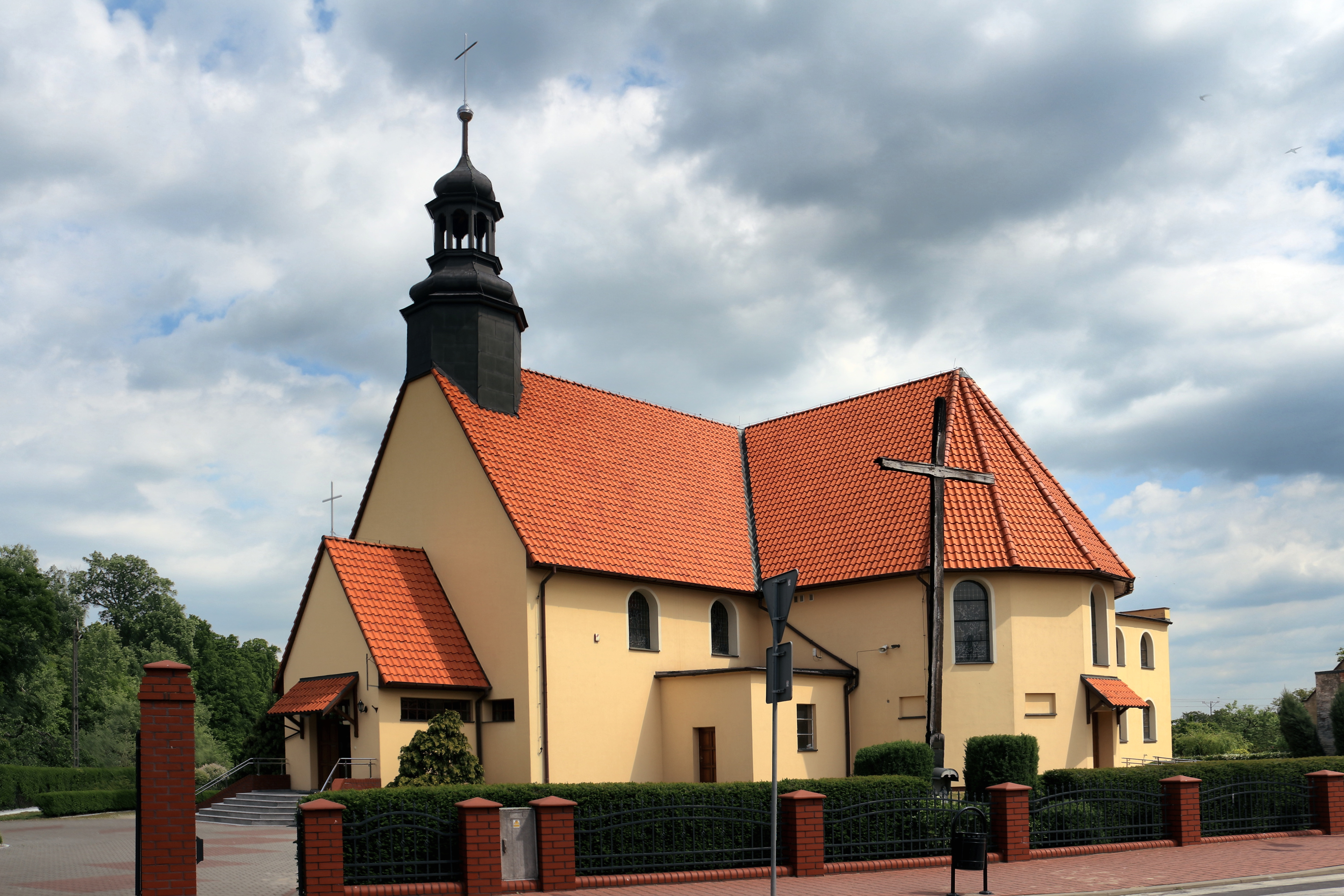
- Exaltation of the Holy Cross church in Szlichtyngowa

- Coat of arms

- Location within Poland
- Coordinates: 51°43′N 16°15′E
- Country: Poland
- Voivodeship: Lubusz
- County: Wschowa
- Gmina: Szlichtyngowa
- Established: 1644
- Town rights: 1644

Government
  - Mayor: Jolanta Wielgus

Area
  - Total: 1.6 km^{2} (0.62 sq mi)

Population (2019-06-30)
  - Total: 1,278
  - Density: 800/km^{2} (2,100/sq mi)
- Time zone: UTC+1 (CET)
  - Summer (DST): UTC+2 (CEST)
- Postal code: 67-407
- Area code: +48 65
- Vehicle registration: FWL
- Climate: Dfb
- Website: http://www.szlichtyngowa.pl/

Szlichtyngowa [ʂlixtɨŋˈɡɔva] (German: Schlichtingsheim) is a town in western Poland, in the Wschowa County of the Lubuskie Voivodship, near the Oder river.

The population as of 2019 was 1,278.

== History ==
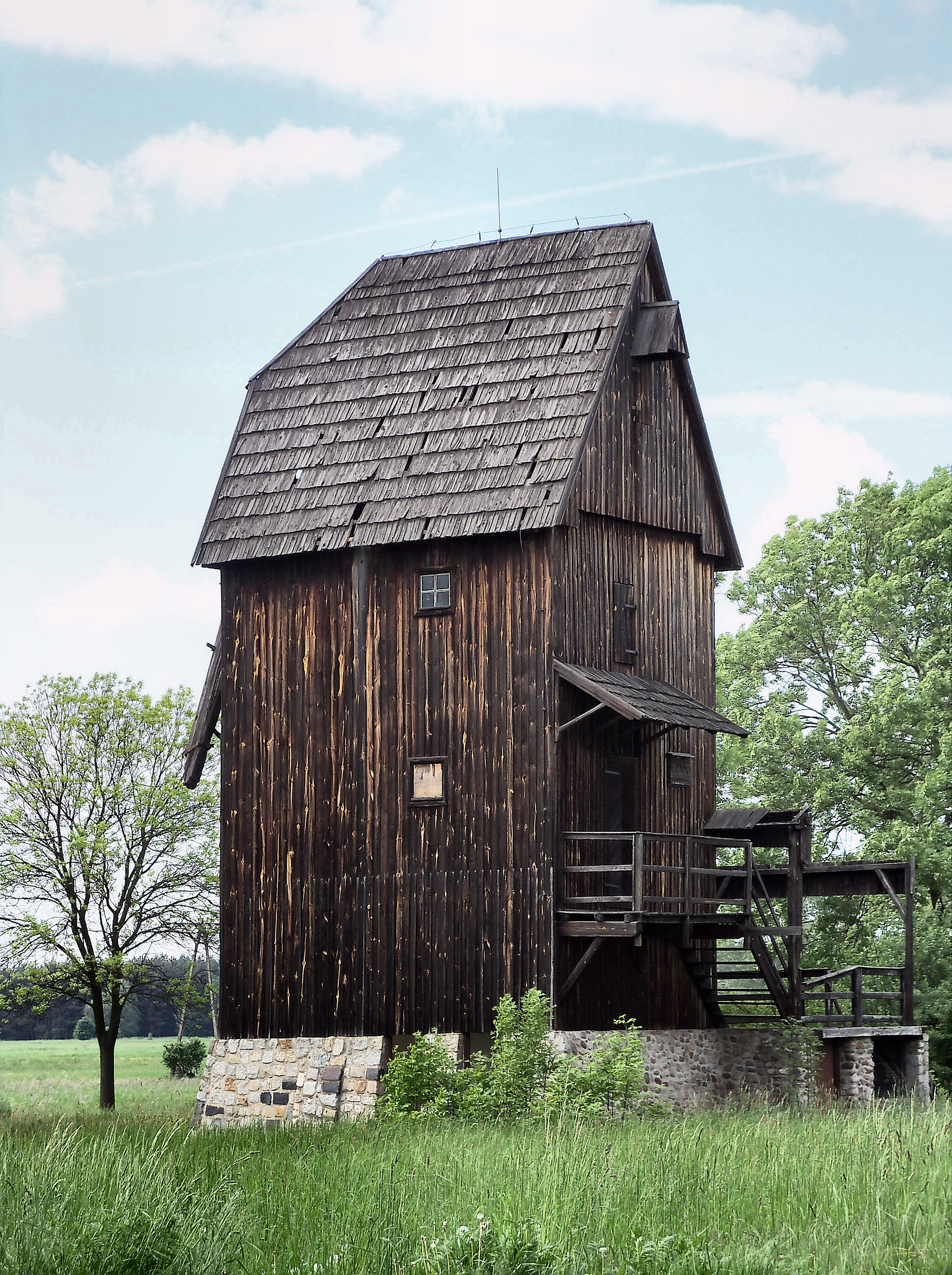
Historic 18th-century post mill in Szlichtyngowa

The town was founded in 1644 by a Polish Protestant activist and Sejm deputy Jan Jerzy Szlichtyng (German: Johann Georg von Schlichting) and was named after him Szlichtyngowa/Schlichtingsheim. From 1634 he bought lands in the vicinity of the village of Górczyna in Greater Poland near the border with Silesia, with the intention of establishing a town for religious refugees from Silesia during the Thirty Years' War. It obtained town rights from the Polish King Władysław IV Vasa, by virtue of a privilege issued in Kraków in July 1644.

After the Second Partition of Poland in 1793 it was annexed by Prussia. After the successful Greater Poland uprising of 1806, it was regained by Poles and included within the short-lived Duchy of Warsaw, and in 1815 it was re-annexed by Prussia. The town was then subjected to Germanisation. It was part of the Fraustadt district in the Province of Posen. From 1871, it was part of Germany. A railway station was built in 1906. Despite belonging to the historic Greater Poland, i.e. the cradle of the Polish state, after Poland regained independence in 1918, it remained in Germany under the Treaty of Versailles, because it was almost entirely populated by Germans. With the dissolution of the Province of Posen, it became part of the Prussian Province of Posen-West Prussia, within which it remained until 1938, when it became part of the Province of Silesia and in 1941, Lower Silesia.

In spring 1945, the town was captured by the Red Army and after the defeat of Nazi Germany in World War II, it became again part of Poland. The largely abandoned town was repopulated with Poles from the nearby Leszno and Rawicz counties, those returning from forced labour from Germany, as well as those expelled from eastern Polish territories, annexed by the Soviet Union. The remaining German population was expelled.

== Transport ==
Szlichtyngowa lies on national road 12.

Vovoideship road 324 connects the town to Góra to the east.

The nearest railway station is in Wschowa.

== Sources ==
- "Szlichtyngowa" at Geographical Dictionary of the Kingdom of Poland vol. XI p. 959
