= Golla =

Golla may refer to:

- Golla (caste), a caste from Andhra Pradesh, India
- Golla (company), a Finnish design company making cases and bags for portable electronics

== People with the surname ==
- George Golla, Australian jazz guitarist
- Victor Golla, American linguist
- Wojciech Golla, Polish footballer
- Frank Golla, Filipino basketball player
- Johannes Golla, German Handball player

== See also ==
- Gola (disambiguation)
