= Čobotas =

- Lithuanian surname
- m.: Čobotas
- f.: (unmarried): Čobotaitė
- f.: (married): Čobotienė
- Related names: Czobot, Csoboth, Chobot

Čobotas is a Lithuanian surname. Notable people with the surname include:

- Augustinas Čobotas, past member of Lithuania band Garbanotas
- Medardas Čobotas, Polish-Lithuanian politician
