= Bolesławiec, Łódź Voivodeship =

Bolesławiec
- Town
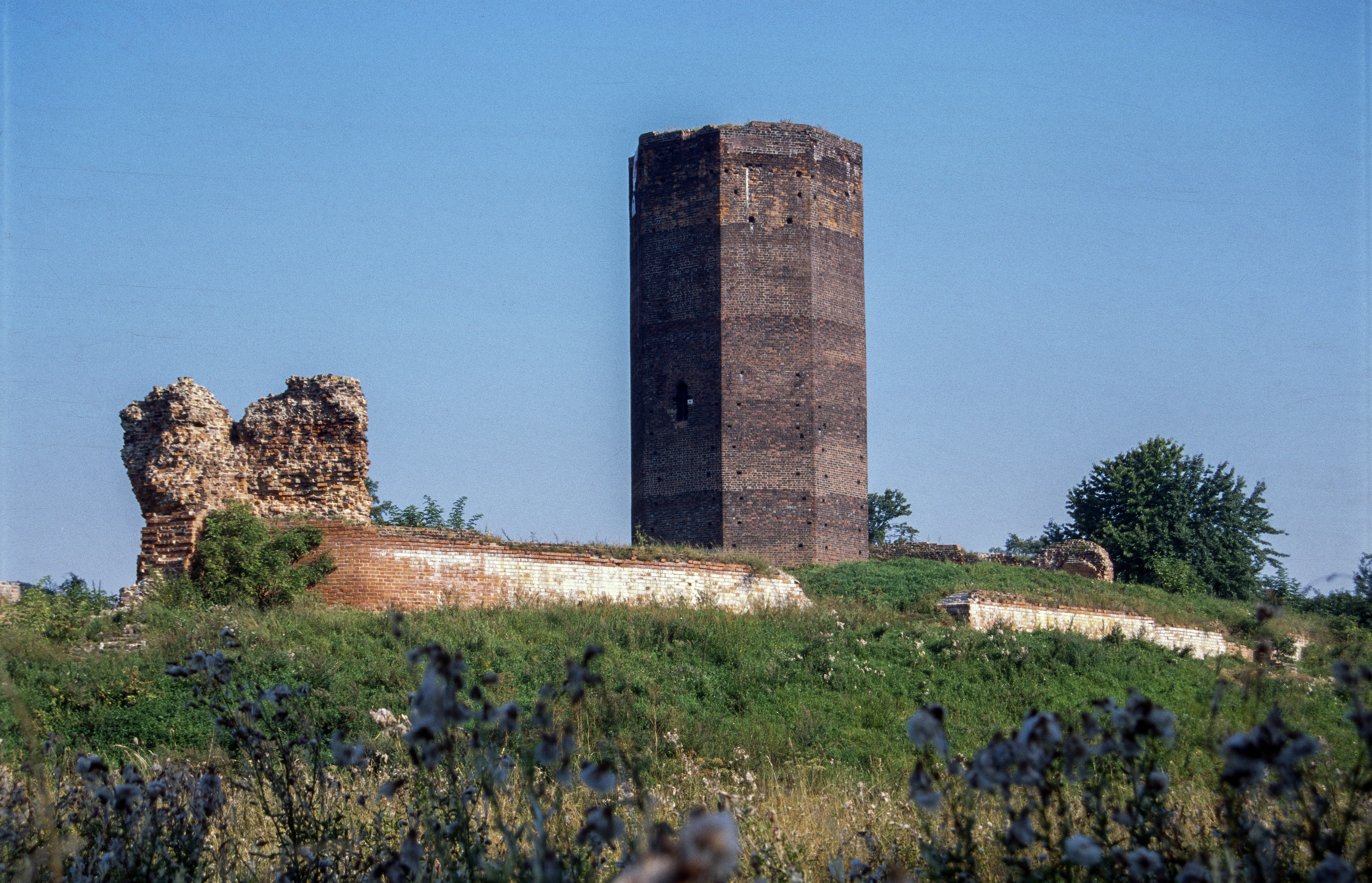
- Ruins of the castle

- Location within Poland
- Coordinates: 51°11′55″N 18°11′26″E
- Country: Poland
- Voivodeship: Łódź
- County: Wieruszów
- Gmina: Bolesławiec
- Established: 13th century
- Founder: Bolesław the Pious
- Named for: Bolesław the Pious

Population (approx.)
  - Total: 900
- Time zone: UTC+1 (CET)
  - Summer (DST): UTC+2 (CEST)
- Vehicle registration: EWE
- Climate: Cfb

Bolesławiec [bɔlɛˈswavjɛt͡s] is a town in Wieruszów County, Łódź Voivodeship, in south-central Poland. It is the seat of the gmina (administrative district) called Gmina Bolesławiec.

== History ==
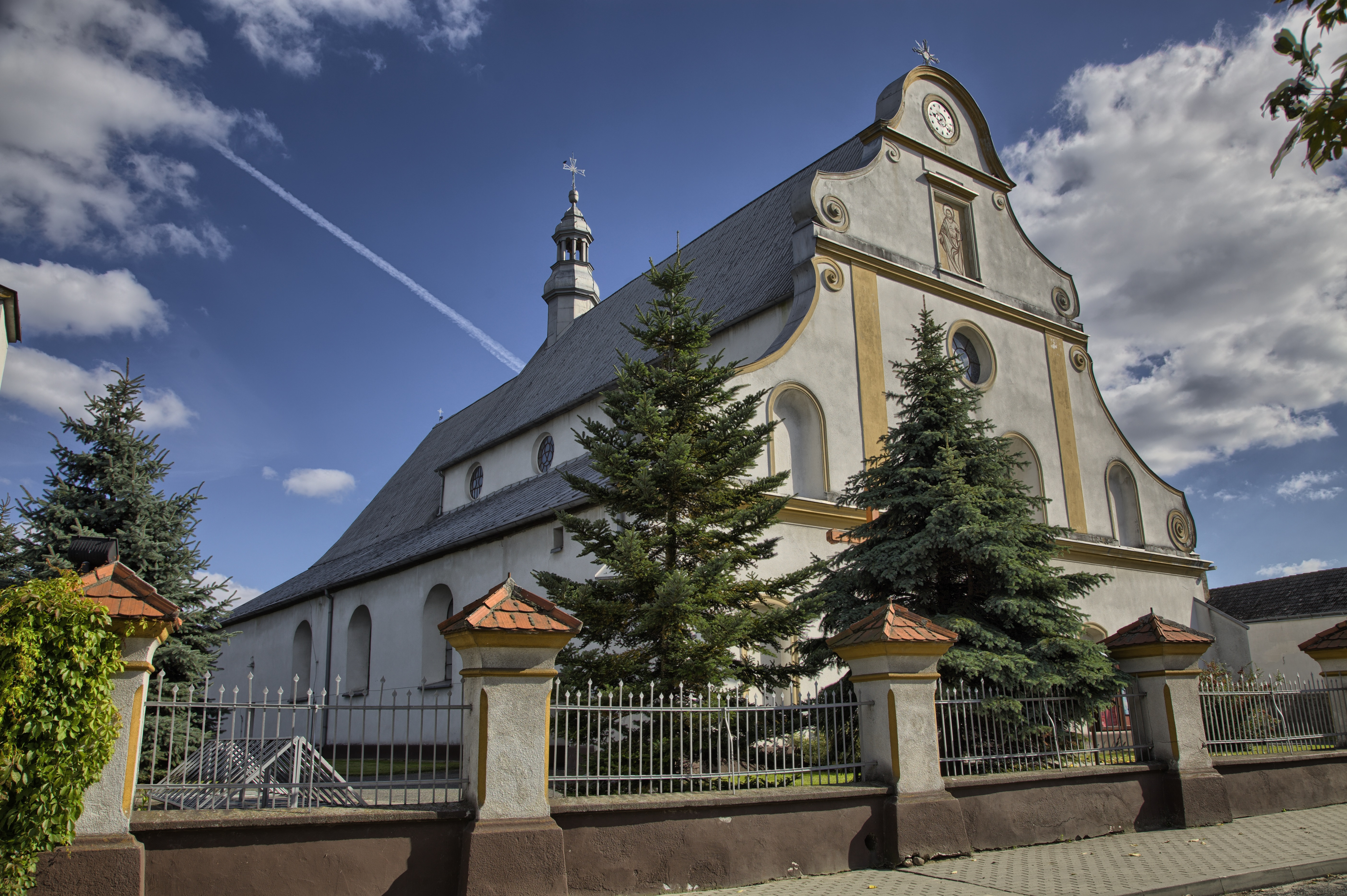
Baroque Holy Trinity church

The town and castle were founded by Duke of Greater Poland Bolesław the Pious of the Piast dynasty. The town was named after him. The castle was captured by King John of Bohemia, but was regained by Polish King Casimir III the Great in 1335. Casimir III then partially rebuilt and strengthened the castle. Bolesławiec was royal town of the Kingdom of Poland, administratively located in the Wieluń County in the Sieradz Voivodeship in the Greater Poland Province. During the Swedish invasion of Poland of 1655–1660, it was captured by the Swedes, however, it was later renovated by local starost Jan Radziejowski.

In the interwar period, it was administratively located in the Łódź Voivodeship of Poland. According to the 1921 census, Bolesławiec had a population of 1,854, 72.9% Polish and 27.1% Jewish.

Following the joint German-Soviet invasion of Poland, which started World War II in 1939, Bolesławiec was occupied by Germany. Before the war, more than 500 Jews lived in Bolesławiec. Until August 1941, the village's Jews were murdered by the occupiers in the Holocaust, and some were deported to larger Jewish concentrations in the area, and they too were eventually murdered. The occupiers initially renamed the village to Klein Buntzlau, and in 1943, to Bolkenburg. After the end of German occupation in 1945, the original name was restored.
