= Wyszanów, Lubusz Voivodeship =

Wyszanów
- Village
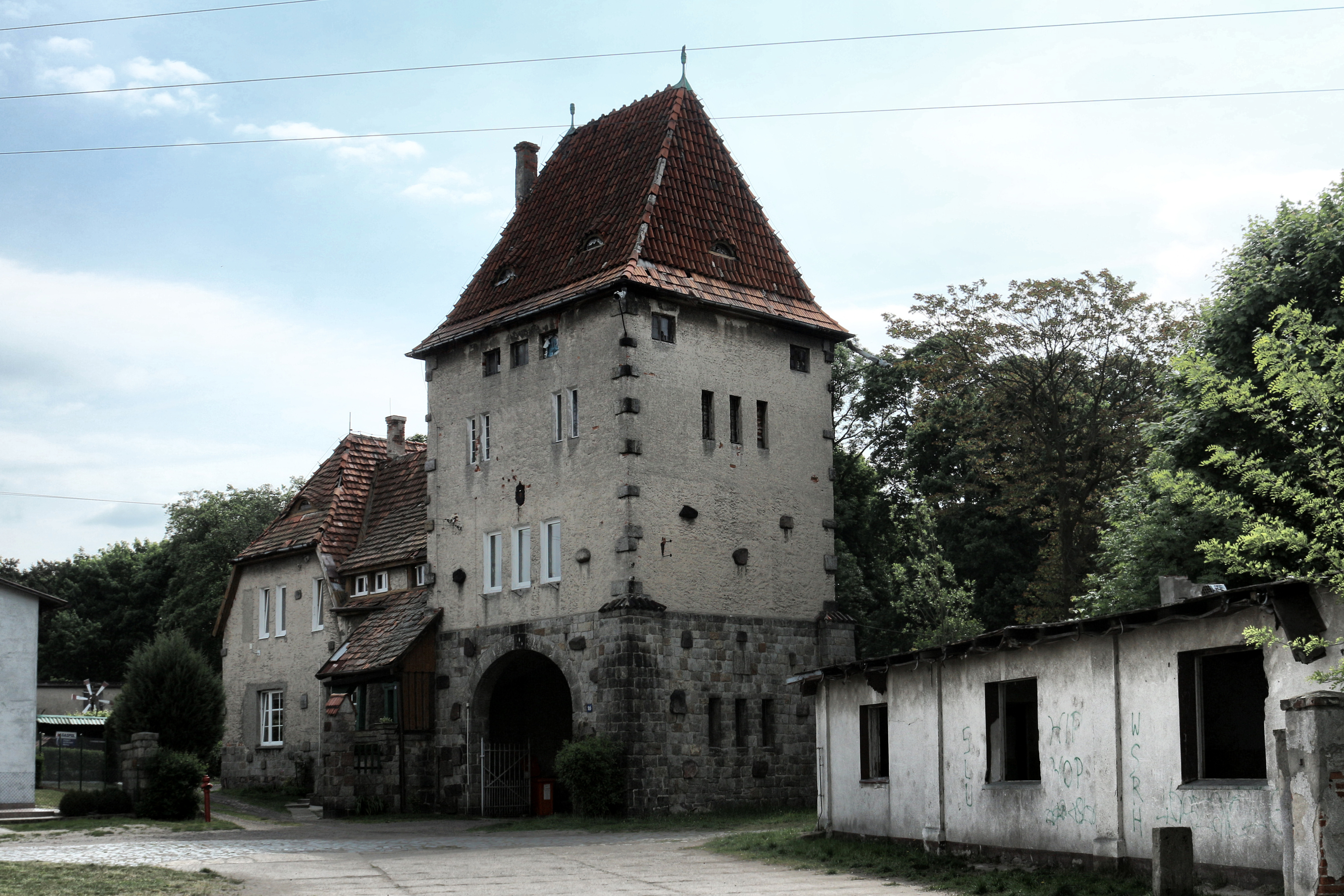

- Location within Poland
- Coordinates: 51°41′27″N 16°15′55″E
- Country: Poland
- Voivodeship: Lubusz
- County: Wschowa
- Gmina: Szlichtyngowa

Wyszanów [vɨˈʂanuf] (German: Schwusen) is a village in the administrative district of Gmina Szlichtyngowa, within Wschowa County, Lubusz Voivodeship, in western Poland.
