= Małe Drzewce =

- Village
- Location within Poland
- Coordinates: 51°46′56″N 16°9′33″E
- Country: Poland
- Voivodeship: Lubusz
- County: Wschowa
- Gmina: Szlichtyngowa

Małe Drzewce [ˈmawɛ ˈdʐɛft͡sɛ] is a village in the administrative district of Gmina Szlichtyngowa, within Wschowa County, Lubusz Voivodeship, in western Poland.
