= Golla (company) =

Finnish design company

Golla Oy
- Founded: 1994
- Headquarters: Helsinki, Finland
- Key people: Petri Kähkönen, CEO
- Products: Bags, backpacks and smartphone cases
- Parent: Tura Group AB
- Website: www.golla.com

Golla Oy is a Finnish design company making cases and bags for urban lifestyle. One of the central aspects of Golla's products is their unique design. Founded in 1994, Tura Group AB acquired the Golla brand in 2023. Currently Golla has offices in Finland, Germany and China. The company's headquarters is located in Helsinki, Finland, where the product design also occurs.

== History ==
Logo from 2013

Golla was established in the small rural town of Kolla, Finland in 1994, where it began producing design items such as CD stands and racks. One of these early models was sold in the gift shop of the Museum of Modern Art in New York City. Golla later designed protective cases for mobile phones. Its established collection helped draw Nokia as a partner, and Golla became a subcontractor. After working with Nokia, Golla shifted its focus to carry solutions for all kinds of portable devices. As of 2008, Golla products have been sold in more than 100 countries.

Revenue dropped from 2010 to 2020 by ten million. As of November 2023, Petri Kähkönen was owner and CEO of Golla Oy. Tura Group AB acquired the Golla brand on November 1, 2023, acquiring 100% of Golla Oy's shares.

As of 2026, the Golla website advertised backpacks, nursing bags, laptop sleeves, and other products.

== Products ==
Golla bags and logo on display at the Mobile World Congress event in 2016.

Golla releases annually a new collection consisting of bags, backpacks and sleeves for laptops from 11" to 17". The collections also include a range of cases for mobile phones.

== See also ==
- List of companies of Finland
- Rosetti (company)
- Messenger bag
