= Nowe Drzewce =

- Village
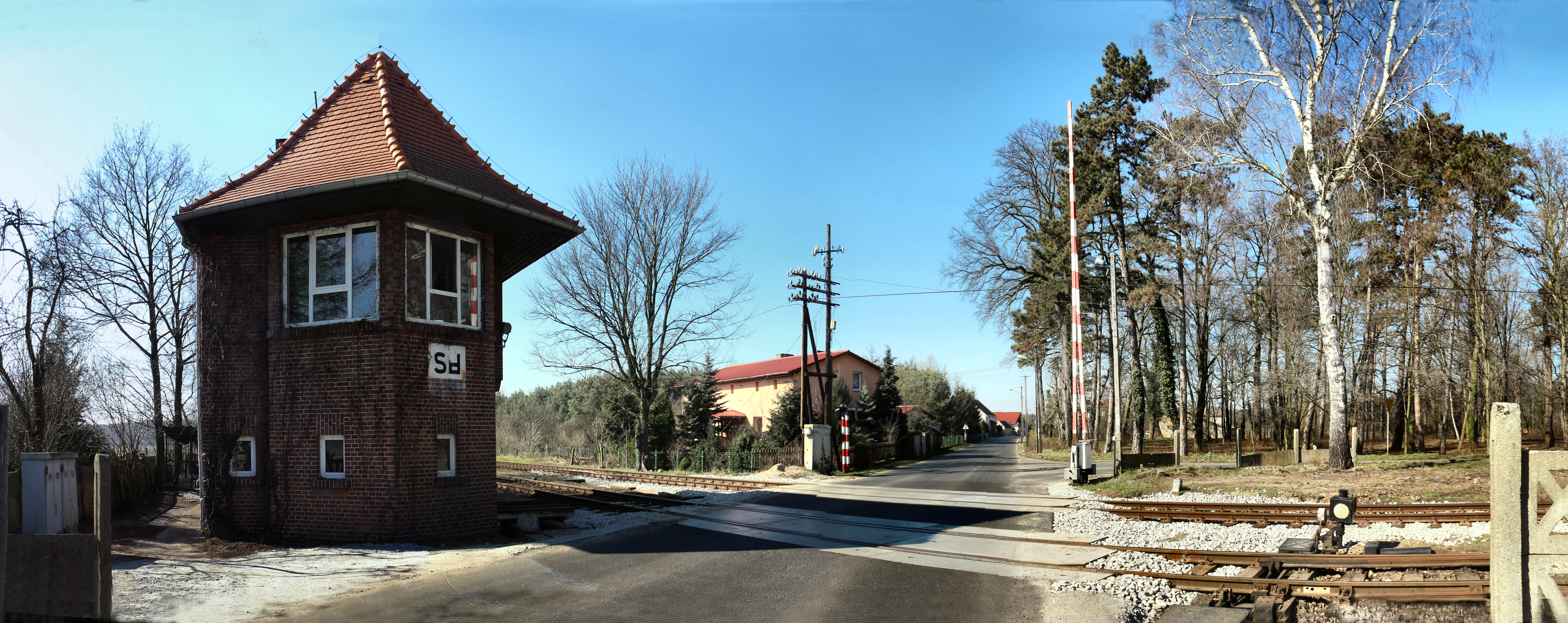

- Location within Poland
- Coordinates: 51°46′33″N 16°11′30″E
- Country: Poland
- Voivodeship: Lubusz
- County: Wschowa
- Gmina: Szlichtyngowa

Nowe Drzewce [ˈnɔvɛ ˈdʐɛft͡sɛ] is a village in the administrative district of Gmina Szlichtyngowa, within Wschowa County, Lubusz Voivodeship, in western Poland.
