= Jędrzychowice, Wschowa County =

Jędrzychowice
- Village
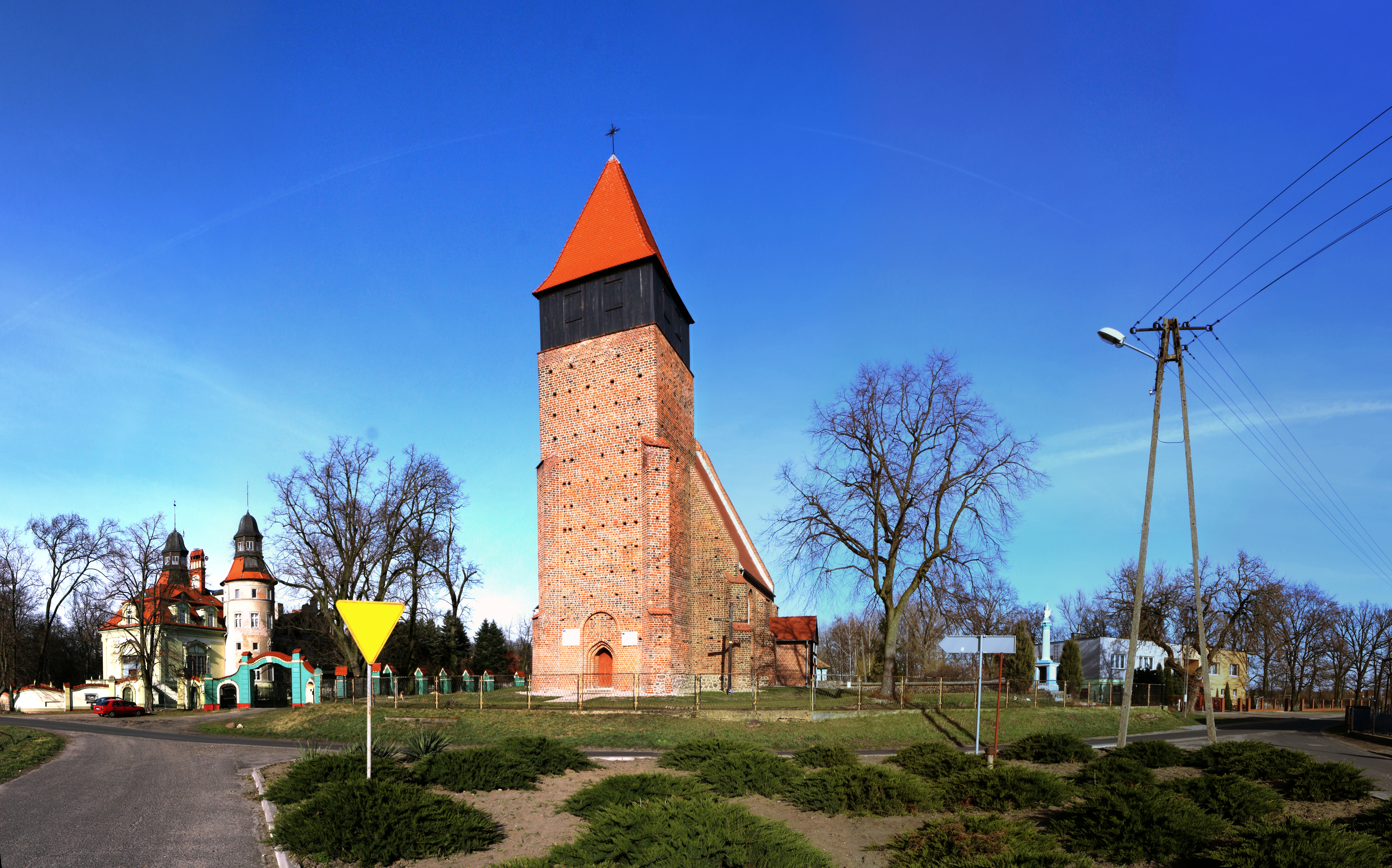

- Location within Poland
- Coordinates: 51°44′N 16°18′E
- Country: Poland
- Voivodeship: Lubusz
- County: Wschowa
- Gmina: Szlichtyngowa

Jędrzychowice [jɛndʐɨxɔˈvit͡sɛ] is a village in the administrative district of Gmina Szlichtyngowa, within Wschowa County, Lubusz Voivodeship, in western Poland.
