= Kowalewo, Lubusz Voivodeship =

Kowalewo
- Village
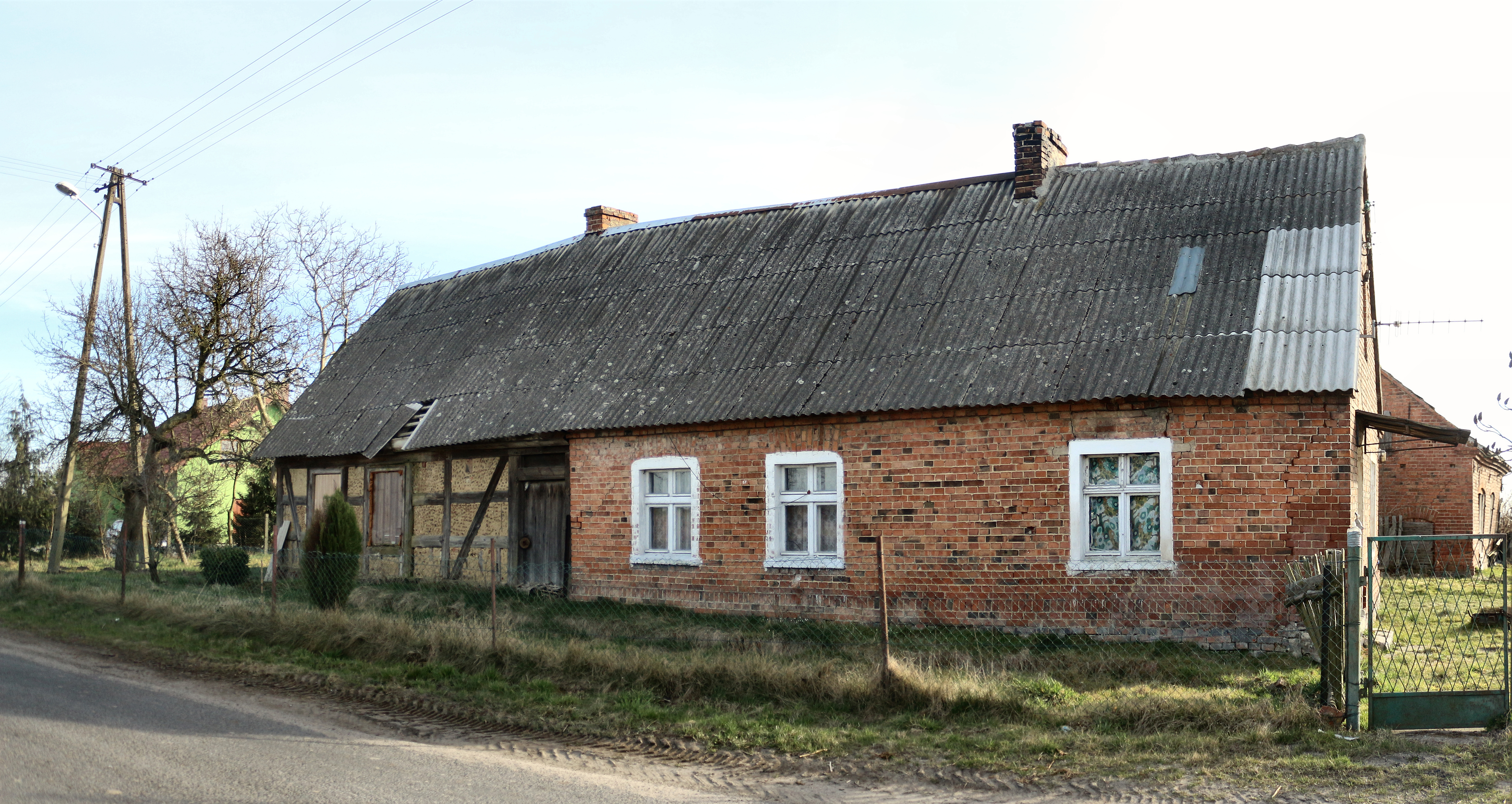

- Location within Poland
- Coordinates: 51°44′N 16°19′E
- Country: Poland
- Voivodeship: Lubusz
- County: Wschowa
- Gmina: Szlichtyngowa

Kowalewo [kɔvaˈlɛvɔ] (German: Kabel) is a village in the administrative district of Gmina Szlichtyngowa, within Wschowa County, Lubusz Voivodeship, in western Poland.
