= Kamionka, Wieruszów County =

Kamionka
- Village
- Location within Poland
- Coordinates: 51°13′31″N 18°12′32″E
- Country: Poland
- Voivodeship: Łódź
- County: Wieruszów
- Gmina: Bolesławiec

Kamionka [kaˈmjɔnka] is a village in the administrative district of Gmina Bolesławiec, within Wieruszów County, Łódź Voivodeship, in central Poland.
