= Stanisławówka, Łódź Voivodeship =

Stanisławówka
- Settlement
- Location within Poland
- Coordinates: 51°13′16″N 18°14′53″E
- Country: Poland
- Voivodeship: Łódź
- County: Wieruszów
- Gmina: Bolesławiec

Stanisławówka [staniswaˈvufka] is a settlement in the administrative district of Gmina Bolesławiec, within Wieruszów County, Łódź Voivodeship, in central Poland.
