= Chróścin-Zamek =

Settlement in Gmina Bolesławiec, Poland

- Settlement
- Location within Poland
- Coordinates: 51°10′26″N 18°11′03″E
- Country: Poland
- Voivodeship: Łódź
- County: Wieruszów
- Gmina: Bolesławiec

Chróścin-Zamek [ˈxruɕt͡ɕin ˈzamɛk] is a settlement in the administrative district of Gmina Bolesławiec, within Wieruszów County, Łódź Voivodeship, in central Poland.
