= Bolesławiec-Chróścin =

- Village
- Location within Poland
- Coordinates: 51°10′N 18°11′E
- Country: Poland
- Voivodeship: Łódź
- County: Wieruszów
- Gmina: Bolesławiec
- Website: https://web.archive.org/web/20140517052104/http://chroscin.pl/

Bolesławiec-Chróścin [bɔlɛˈswavjɛt͡s ˈxruɕt͡ɕin] is a village in the administrative district of Gmina Bolesławiec, within Wieruszów County, Łódź Voivodeship, in central Poland.
