= Mieleszyn, Łódź Voivodeship =

Mieleszyn
- Village
- Location within Poland
- Coordinates: 51°14′32″N 18°11′49″E
- Country: Poland
- Voivodeship: Łódź
- County: Wieruszów
- Gmina: Bolesławiec
- Climate: Cfb

Mieleszyn [mjɛˈlɛʂɨn] is a village in the administrative district of Gmina Bolesławiec, within Wieruszów County, Łódź Voivodeship, in central Poland.
