= Gmina Szlichtyngowa =

Gmina Szlichtyngowa Szlichtyngowa Commune
- Gmina
- Coat of arms
- Interactive map of Gmina Szlichtyngowa
- Coordinates (Szlichtyngowa): 51°43′N 16°15′E
- Country: Poland
- Voivodeship: Lubusz
- County: Wschowa
- Seat: Szlichtyngowa

Area
  - Total: 99.74 km^{2} (38.51 sq mi)

Population (2019-06-30)
  - Total: 5,053
  - Density: 50.66/km^{2} (131.2/sq mi)
  - Urban: 1,278
  - Rural: 3,775
- Website: http://www.nowa.szlichtyngowa.pl/

Gmina Szlichtyngowa is an urban-rural gmina (administrative district) in Wschowa County, Lubusz Voivodeship, in western Poland. Its seat is the town of Szlichtyngowa, which lies approximately 10 kilometres (6 mi) south of Wschowa and 57 km (35 mi) south-east of Zielona Góra.

The gmina covers an area of 99.74 square kilometres (38.5 sq mi), and as of 2019 its total population is 5,053.

== Villages ==
Apart from the town of Szlichtyngowa, Gmina Szlichtyngowa contains the villages and settlements of Dryżyna, Gola, Górczyna, Jędrzychowice, Kowalewo, Małe Drzewce, Nowe Drzewce, Puszcza, Stare Drzewce, Wyszanów and Zamysłów.

== Neighbouring gminas ==
Gmina Szlichtyngowa is bordered by the gminas of Głogów, Kotla, Niechlów, Pęcław, Sława and Wschowa.
