= Stare Drzewce =

- Village
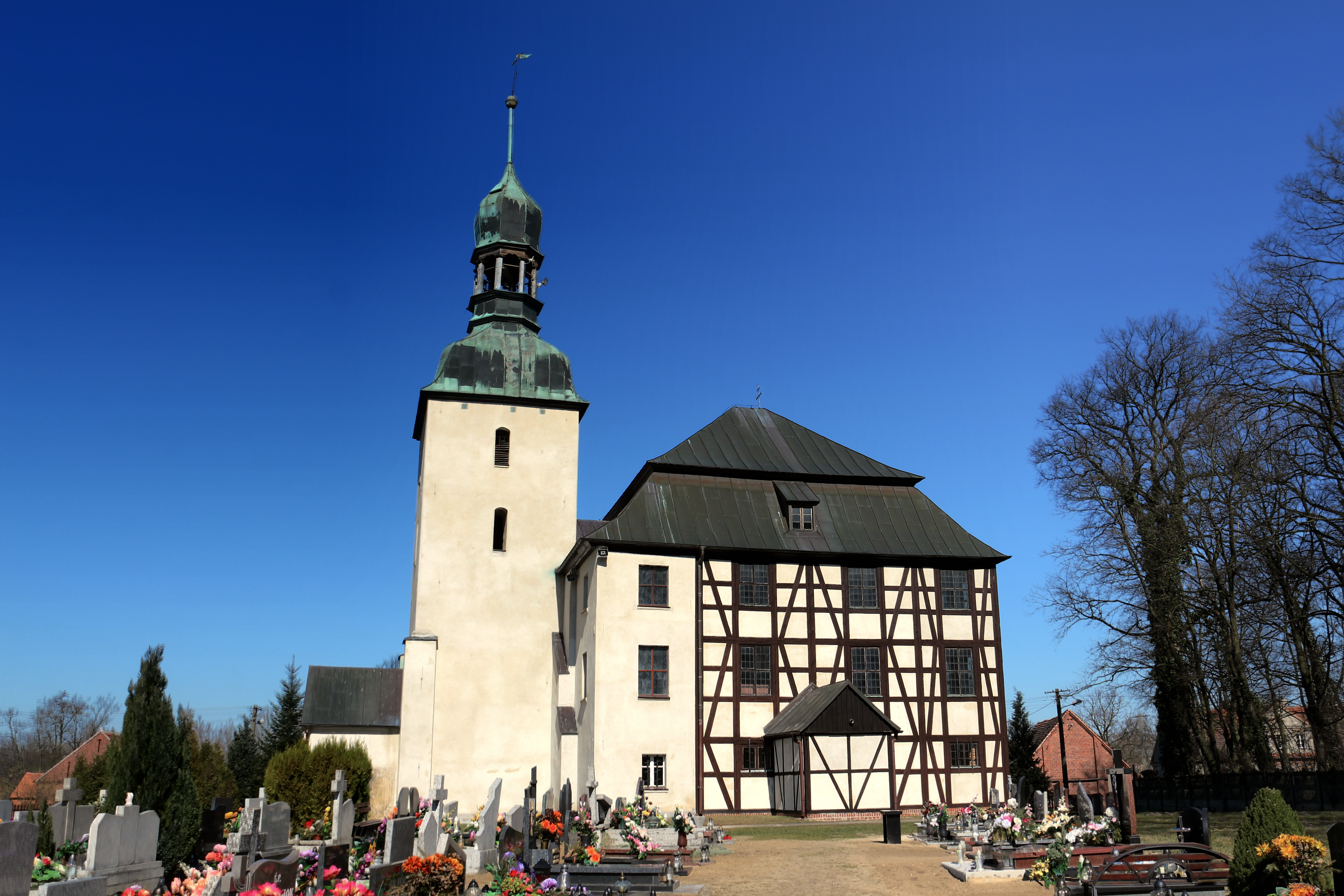

- Location within Poland
- Coordinates: 51°46′N 16°13′E
- Country: Poland
- Voivodeship: Lubusz
- County: Wschowa
- Gmina: Szlichtyngowa

Stare Drzewce [ˈstarɛ ˈdʐɛft͡sɛ] (German: Alt Driebitz) is a village in the administrative district of Gmina Szlichtyngowa, within Wschowa County, Lubusz Voivodeship, in western Poland.
