= Zamysłów =

- Village
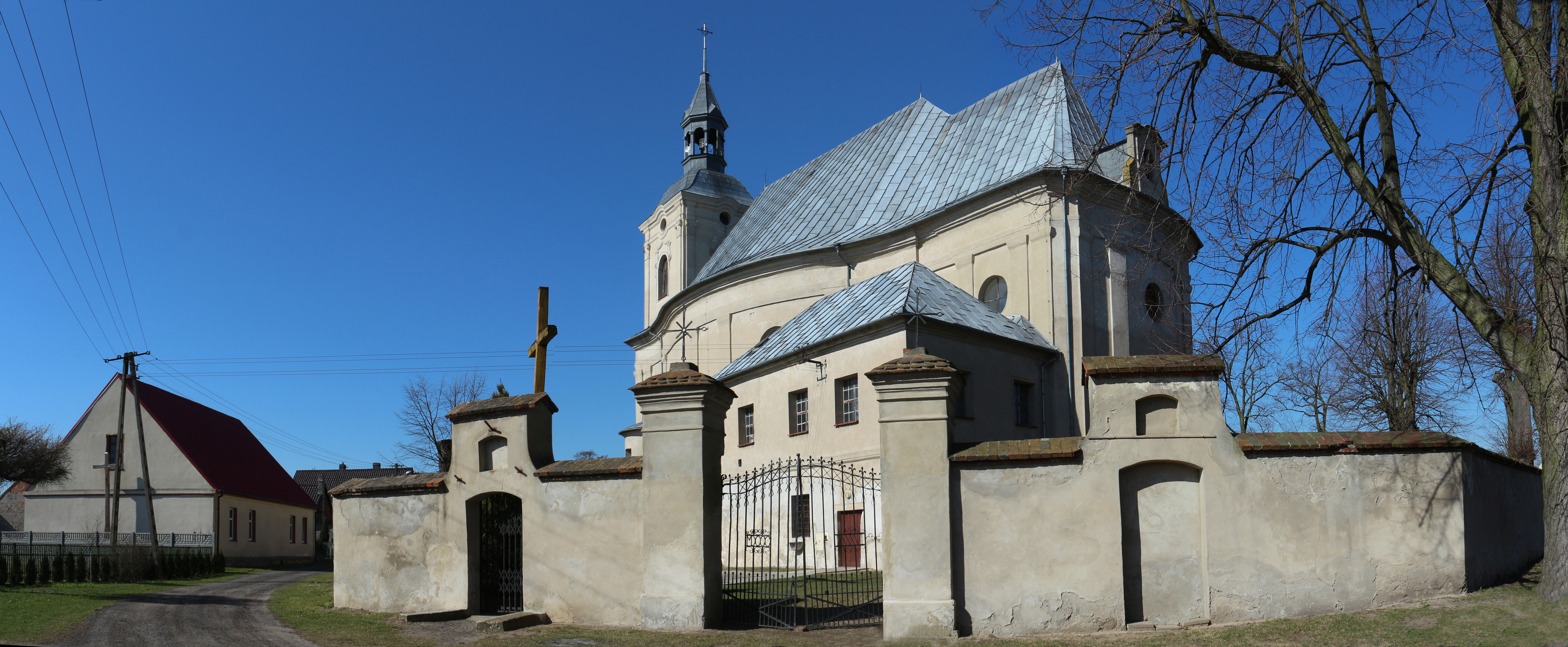

- Location within Poland
- Coordinates: 51°44′N 16°14′E
- Country: Poland
- Voivodeship: Lubusz
- County: Wschowa
- Gmina: Szlichtyngowa

Zamysłów [zaˈmɨswuf] is a village in the administrative district of Gmina Szlichtyngowa, within Wschowa County, Lubusz Voivodeship, in western Poland.

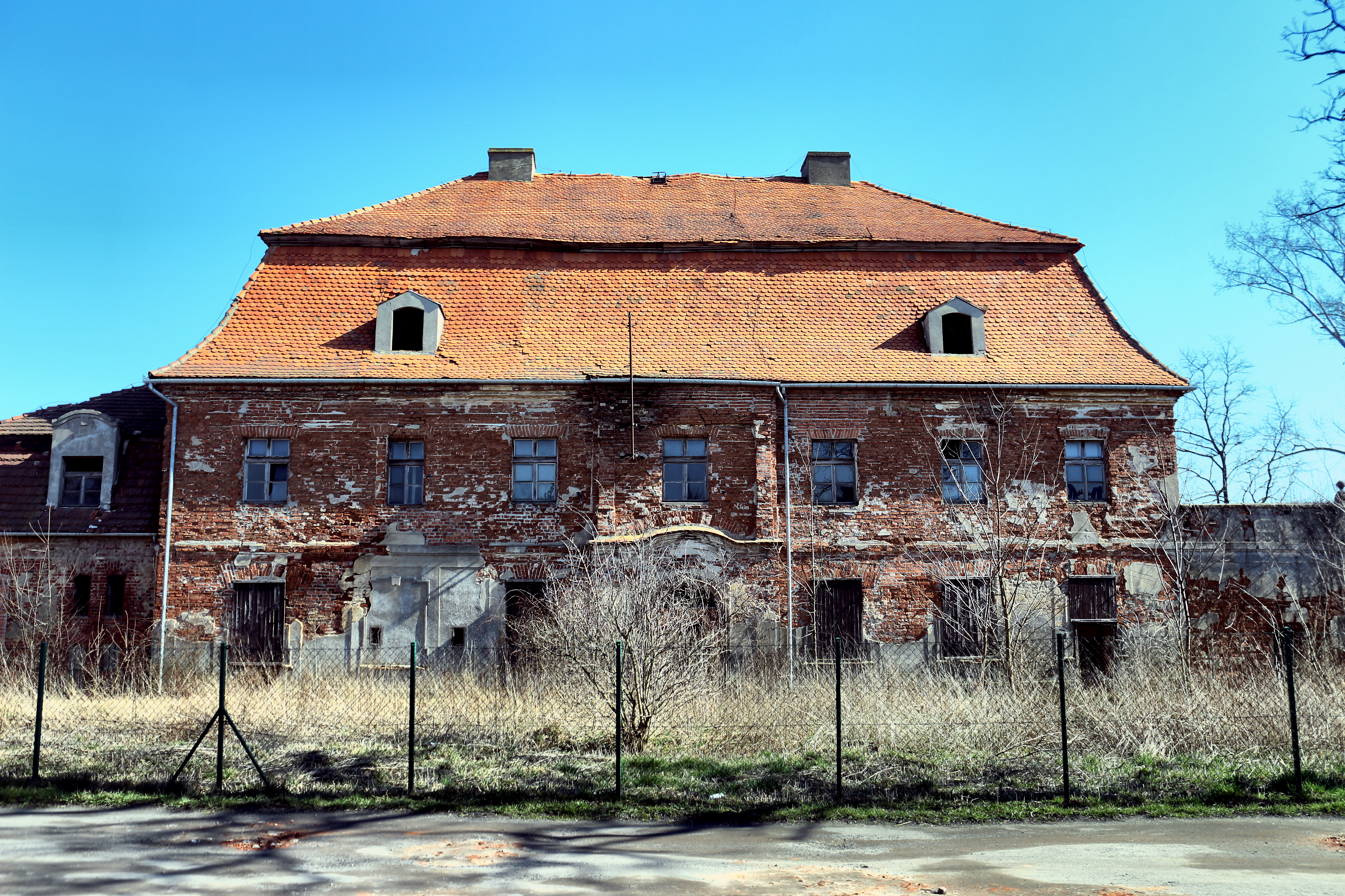
Palace in Zamysłów
