= Krupka (surname) =

Krupka is a Polish surname. Notable people with the surname include:

- Anna Krupka (born 1981), Polish politician
- Jerzy Krupka (fl. early 21st century), Polish scientist
