= Piaski, Gmina Bolesławiec =

Piaski
- Village
- Location within Poland
- Coordinates: 51°12′56″N 18°12′15″E
- Country: Poland
- Voivodeship: Łódź
- County: Wieruszów
- Gmina: Bolesławiec

Piaski (Polish pronunciation: [ˈpjaskʲi]) is a village in the administrative district of Gmina Bolesławiec, within Wieruszów County, Łódź Voivodeship, in central Poland.
