= Puszcza, Lubusz Voivodeship =

Puszcza
- Settlement
- Location within Poland
- Coordinates: 51°43′16″N 16°14′31″E
- Country: Poland
- Voivodeship: Lubusz
- County: Wschowa
- Gmina: Szlichtyngowa

Puszcza [ˈpuʂt͡ʂa] is a settlement in the administrative district of Gmina Szlichtyngowa, within Wschowa County, Lubusz Voivodeship, in western Poland.
