= Podjaworek =

- Settlement
- Location within Poland
- Coordinates: 51°13′45″N 18°16′39″E
- Country: Poland
- Voivodeship: Łódź
- County: Wieruszów
- Gmina: Bolesławiec

Podjaworek [pɔdjaˈvɔrɛk] is a settlement in the administrative district of Gmina Bolesławiec, within Wieruszów County, Łódź Voivodeship, in central Poland.
