= Żdżary, Wieruszów County =

Żdżary
- Village
- Location within Poland
- Coordinates: 51°13′21″N 18°15′37″E
- Country: Poland
- Voivodeship: Łódź
- County: Wieruszów
- Gmina: Bolesławiec

Żdżary [ˈʐd͡ʐarɨ] is a village in the administrative district of Gmina Bolesławiec, within Wieruszów County, Łódź Voivodeship, in central Poland.
