= Krupka, Łódź Voivodeship =

Krupka
- Settlement
- Location within Poland
- Coordinates: 51°13′22″N 18°11′23″E
- Country: Poland
- Voivodeship: Łódź
- County: Wieruszów
- Gmina: Bolesławiec

Krupka [ˈkrupka] is a settlement in the administrative district of Gmina Bolesławiec, within Wieruszów County, Łódź Voivodeship, in central Poland.
