= Koziołek, Łódź Voivodeship =

Koziołek
- Village
- Location within Poland
- Coordinates: 51°13′37″N 18°14′15″E
- Country: Poland
- Voivodeship: Łódź
- County: Wieruszów
- Gmina: Bolesławiec

Koziołek [kɔˈʑɔwɛk] is a village in the administrative district of Gmina Bolesławiec, within Wieruszów County, Łódź Voivodeship, in central Poland.
