= Posen–West Prussia =

Province of Prussia (1922–1938)

Frontier March of Posen–West Prussia Grenzmark Posen–Westpreußen (German) Marchia Graniczna Poznańsko–Zachodniopruska (Polish)
- A province of Prussia
- 1919/1922–1938
- Flag (1923–1935) Coat of arms

- Posen–West Prussia (red) within the Free State of Prussia (blue).
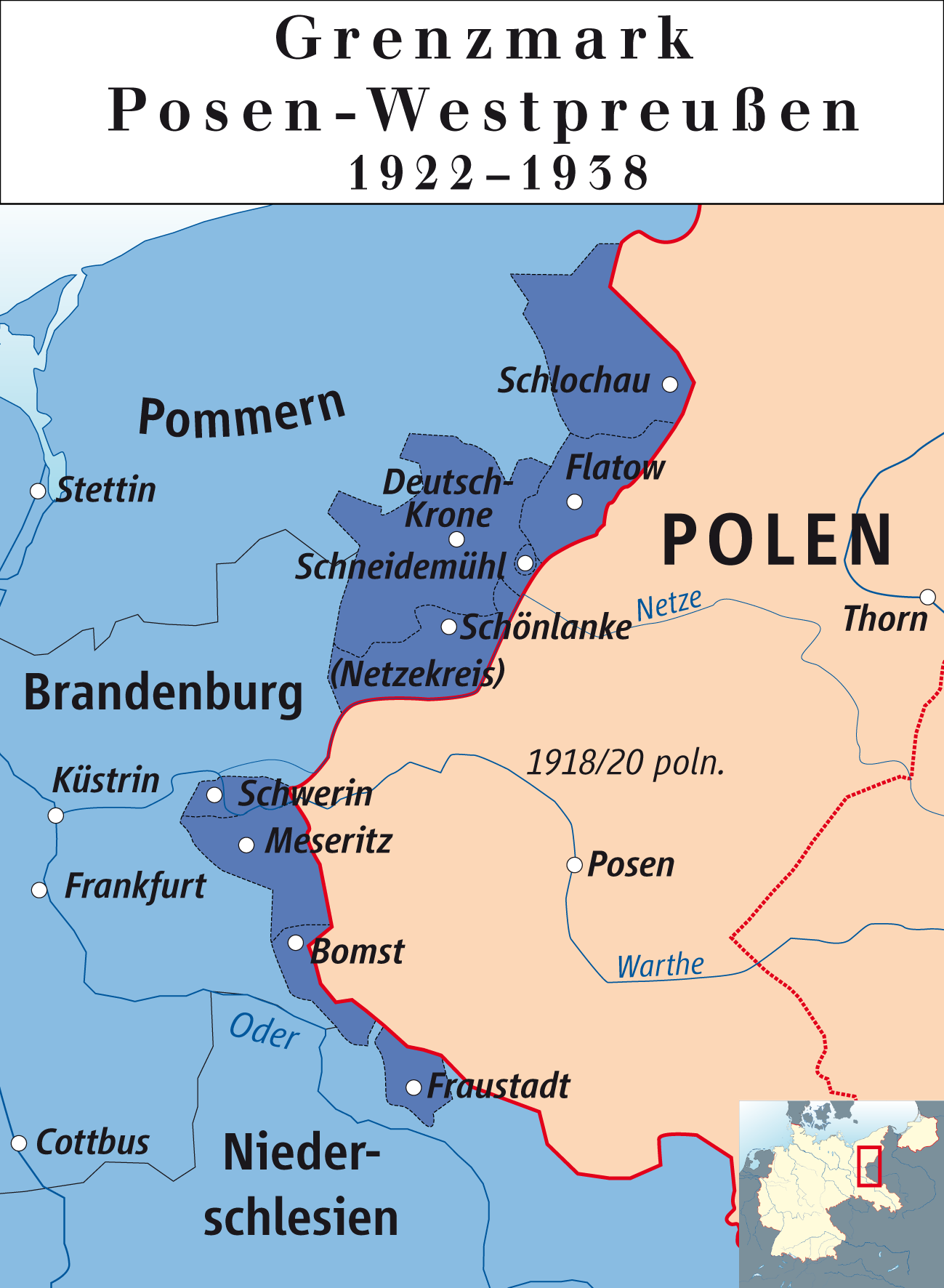
- Posen–West Prussia in dark blue
- Capital: Schneidemühl
- Area
  - Coordinates: 53°9′N 16°44′E
  - 1925: 7,695 km^{2} (2,971 sq mi)
- Population
  - 1925: 332,400
- History
  - Created from parts of Posen and West Prussia: 1919/1922
  - Governed by Brandenburg: 1934
  - Divided between Brandenburg, Pomerania and Silesia: 1 October 1938
Preceded by
Province of Posen
West Prussia
Succeeded by
Province of Pomerania (1815–1945)
Province of Brandenburg
Province of Silesia
- Today part of: Poland: ∟Greater Poland; ∟Lubusz; ∟Pomerania; ∟West Pomerania

The Frontier March of Posen–West Prussia (German: Grenzmark Posen–Westpreußen; Polish: Marchia Graniczna Poznańsko–Zachodniopruska) was a province of Prussia from 1919 (de facto) and 1922 (de jure) until its dissolution in 1938. It comprised the three non-contiguous regions of the former provinces of Posen and West Prussia that remained part of Germany following its post-World War I territorial losses to the newly formed Second Polish Republic.

Schneidemühl (present-day Piła, Poland) served as the provincial capital. In 1934, Posen–West Prussia came under the administration of the Province of Brandenburg, and on 1 October 1938 it was officially dissolved by Nazi Germany. Its lands were then incorporated into the neighbouring provinces of Pomerania, Brandenburg and Silesia. Following World War II, the entire area of the former province became part of Poland.

== Background ==
Until the late 18th century partitions of Poland, the territory which later made up Posen–West Prussia was part of the Greater Poland and East Pomeranian regions of the Polish–Lithuanian Commonwealth. In the First Partition of Poland in 1772, the Kingdom of Prussia established the Province of West Prussia and the Netze District on land annexed from the Pomeranian and Greater Polish (and Kuyavian) territories, respectively. The Province of South Prussia was established as part of the 1793 Second Partition and included the remainder of Greater Poland along with some additional territory.

In 1807, during the Napoleonic Wars, South Prussia, the Kulmerland (part of West Prussia) and a portion of the Netze District, along with New Silesia and New East Prussia (excluding the area around Białystok, which was ceded to Russia) were made part of the newly formed Napoleonic client state called the Duchy of Warsaw; at the same time, Danzig was detached from West Prussia as the Free City of Danzig. The parts of the Netze District which remained within the Kingdom of Prussia were incorporated into West Prussia. After the Napoleonic Wars and the 1815 Congress of Vienna, the Duchy of Warsaw was partitioned between the Grand Duchy of Posen under Prussia, the Kingdom of Poland under Russia and the Free City of Cracow (a joint protectorate of Austria, Prussia, and Russia); Danzig was returned to West Prussia. The Grand Duchy of Posen was made up mostly of former parts of South Prussia and the Netze District, but it also included the Kulmerland which had been part of West Prussia before 1807. The Kulmerland was returned to West Prussia in 1817.

Neither Posen (which was nominally semi-autonomous) nor West Prussia was part of the German Confederation of 1815–1866, to which the majority of Prussia belonged. The two provinces' populations were predominantly Catholic and Polish-speaking, while a sizable Protestant German minority existed along their western fringes. Posen lost its semi-autonomous status after the failed Greater Poland Uprising of 1848 and was reorganized as the Province of Posen. As provinces of Prussia, they became part of the North German Confederation in 1867 and of the unified German Empire in 1871. Under the Empire, ethnic tensions between Poles and Germans were exacerbated by the Germanisation policies of the Berlin government and the anti-Catholic Kulturkampf measures enacted by Chancellor Otto von Bismarck.

== History ==
=== Creation ===
Following the German Empire's defeat in World War I, a final Greater Poland Uprising broke out in Posen in December 1918. Its goal was to incorporate the lands that had been annexed by Prussia into a re-established Polish state. The insurgents quickly took the city of Posen from the Germans and controlled most of the rest of the province by mid-January. Despite German protests that the Poles had been the aggressors, the German-Polish armistice signed at Trier on 16 February 1919 established a demarcation line that left the territory occupied by the Poles under their control. The line was subsequently moved farther west, reducing the territory from the Province of Posen that remained in Germany. It consisted of five predominantly German-speaking districts in three non-contiguous parts: Netzekreis farthest to the north; Schwerin an der Warthe, Meseritz and Bomst in the central area; and Fraustadt in the south.

The Province of West Prussia lost over half of its territory to the new Polish Republic under the terms of the Treaty of Versailles, which were announced in May 1919 and became effective in January 1920. In the west, only the regions of Deutsch Krone, Flatow und Schlochau remained with Germany. The districts farthest to the east were made part of the Province of East Prussia as the administrative district of West Prussia with its seat at Marienwerder; the central region was granted to the new Polish state as the Pomeranian Voivodeship, also referred to as the Polish Corridor; and the region around Danzig became a free city under the oversight of the League of Nations.

The areas in orange and red are the parts of the former Province of Posen (in gray) that remained in Germany. (The regions from West Prussia are not shown.) Note: ehem. = 'former'

On 20 November 1919, the Prussian Ministry of the Interior in Berlin established a government office for the combined remnants of the provinces of Posen and West Prussia at Schneidemühl and named the new administrative district the "Frontier March of West Prussia–Posen"; it was subsequently renamed the "Frontier March of Posen–West Prussia" on 11 January 1921. The Regional Council of Bromberg, which was on the Polish side of the border, was relocated to Schneidemühl to take on the role of the unified administration, but since the city did not have the buildings needed to support a provincial capital, the government offices were set up at Meseritz, where the Provinzialverband (a higher-level municipal association within a Prussian province) was permanently located. The capital did not move its offices and personnel to Schneidemühl until 1928.

The Prussian constitution of 20 November 1920 provided for the formation of the new province, but in the Prussian Landtag (parliament) there was heated debate over the matter, with some favouring instead the unification of the various sections with their neighbouring provinces (Pomerania, Brandenburg and Silesia). The parties of the Left – the Communists (KPD), Independent Social Democrats (USPD) and Social Democrats (SPD) – were against creating a new province on economic grounds, while the middle-class parties favoured the new province in part due to their opposition to the Treaty of Versailles. In the border regions themselves, all parties except the KPD supported a new provincial association and the autonomy it would give them in the face of their much larger neighbouring provinces. In the end, the new province was created on 1 July 1922, with its name reflecting the provinces that had lost territory to Poland; the term Grenzmark ("frontier march") underscored the belief that the cession was unjustified. Posen–West Prussia's first president, Friedrich von Bülow, saw the province as a "promontory" against additional Polish territorial claims.

=== Development and government ===
The newly created Frontier March faced the immediate task of creating an administrative structure for the much-reduced German territory. The law that established the province required that it take on all government officials who had worked for Posen or West Prussia, but many government buildings, hospitals, schools and the like were in Poland and needed to be replaced. Rail and other links that were broken at the new border caused economic hardships. Posen–West Prussia needed financial support from the national government for its restructuring, but it was slow in coming because of Weimar Germany's own economic difficulties.

The administration also had to accommodate and integrate many of the Germans who left the territory ceded to Poland. Under the new Polish government's strict policy regarding minorities, well over half of the German speakers in the regions of Posen and West Prussia that had become part of Poland emigrated.

Many German residents of Posen–West Prussia wanted to redraw the border with Poland to give Germany more territory, or even to deny Poland's right to exist. At the same time, much of the populace, including all of the political parties, feared additional Polish expansion. As a result, provincial authorities consistently refused any degree of détente with the new Polish republic.

In the province's Landtag (parliament), the national-conservative and monarchist German National People's Party (DNVP) was the strongest single party until 1933, but it was internally splintered. As a result, a weak coalition of centre and left-of-centre parties was able to maintain a majority. In the last election to the Landtag in March 1933, after the Nazi Party had come to power at the national level, the Nazis took 55% of the votes and 16 of 30 seats.

Friedrich von Bülow, a member of the national-liberal German People's Party, served as governor (Oberpräsident) from the province's formal establishment in 1922 until his retirement in 1933. He was succeeded by DNVP politician Hans von Meibom, who held the office until mid-1933, when the DNVP was dissolved as part of the Nazi regime's Gleichschaltung measures.

=== Nazi era and dissolution ===
On 18 July 1933, following Meibom's removal, administrative authority over Posen–West Prussia was assumed by Wilhelm Kube, the Nazi Oberpräsident of neighbouring Brandenburg. Kube, who had a reputation for corruption, administered both provinces until 7 August 1936. He was dismissed after a political dispute with Nazi jurist Walter Buch, the father-in-law of Martin Bormann. Thereafter, Posen–West Prussia remained under joint administration with Brandenburg under Nazi Oberpräsident Emil Stürtz. Administrative jurisdiction over the province was transferred to the Brandenburg Regional Council at Frankfurt an der Oder in 1937. Posen–West Prussia was formally dissolved on 1 October 1938 and its territory divided between the provinces of Silesia, Pomerania and Brandenburg.

=== Aftermath: World War II and incorporation into Poland ===
After the German invasion of Poland in September 1939 that began World War II, the province was incorporated into the newly formed Reichsgau Wartheland, with smaller portions absorbed into Reichsgau Danzig-West Prussia. German civil administration replaced the short-lived military occupation, and Nazi authorities implemented a programme of forced Germanisation, expulsions of the Polish and Jewish populations, and the establishment of ghettos and camps. The former provincial structures of Posen–West Prussia were not reinstated; the annexation was treated instead as a permanent extension of Nazi Germany, in breach of international law.

Following Germany's defeat in World War II, the entire territory that once constituted the province was placed under Polish administration in accordance with the decisions made at the Potsdam Conference. The Oder–Neisse line was established as the new German-Polish border, moving it considerably westward. As a result, the former German population was subject to mass expulsion and replaced by Poles, many of whom had themselves been displaced from areas annexed by the Soviet Union. The former lands of Posen–West Prussia were fully integrated into the post-war Polish state.

== Subdivisions ==
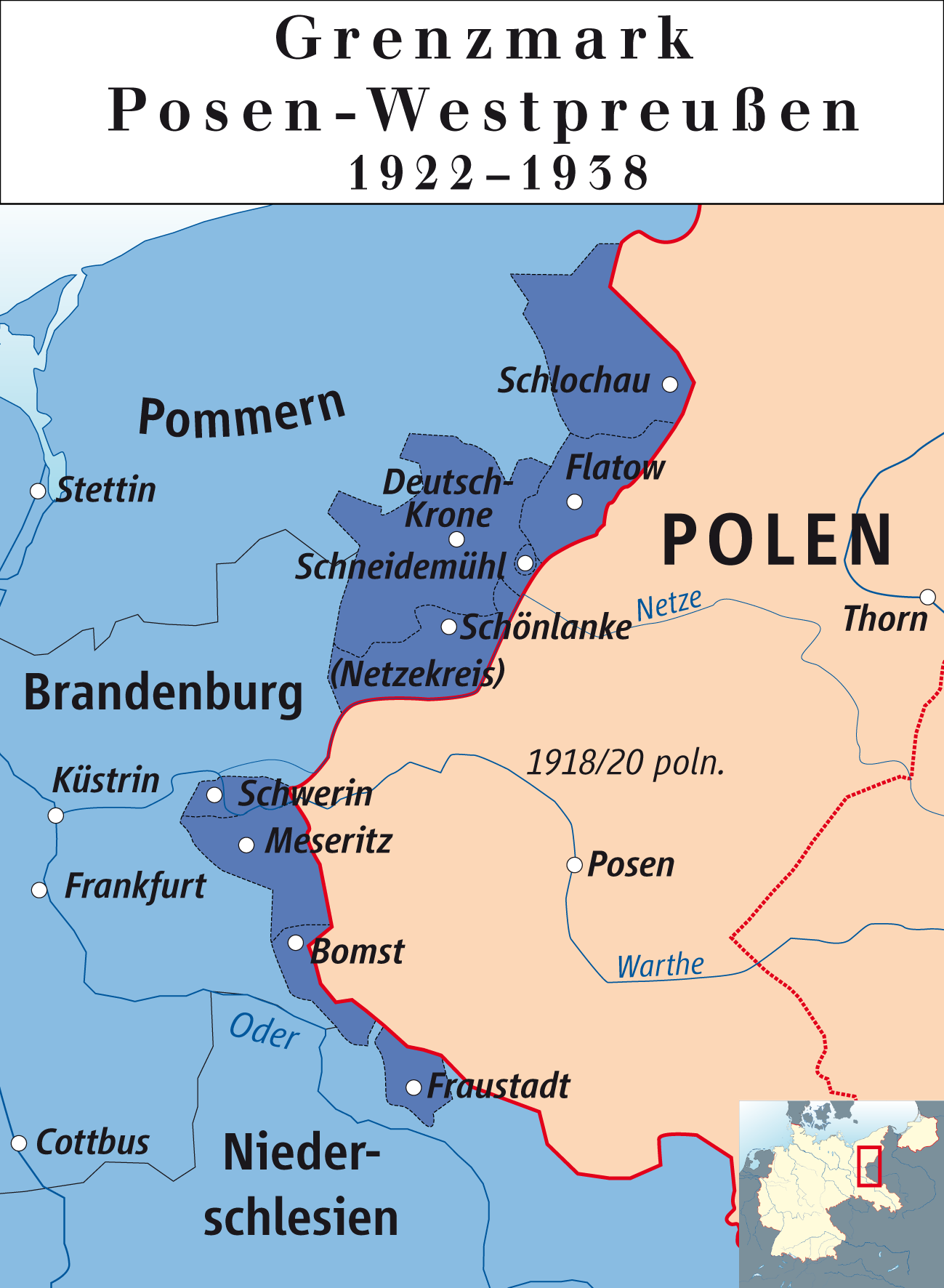
Districts of Posen–West Prussia, 1922–1938. Note that the Fraustadt district is not contiguous with the Bomst district to its north. (Niederschlesien = Lower Silesia)

The capital of Posen–West Prussia and seat of the governor (Oberpräsident) was Schneidemühl. The seat of the province's Landeshauptmann (lit. 'land captain') was at Meseritz. The province consisted of a single governmental district (Regierungsbezirk), Schneidemühl.

From the former Province of Posen:

- Urban district (Stadtkreis); formerly in the Bromberg Region
  1. Schneidemühl
- Rural districts (Kreise); all were formerly in the Posen Region, except Netzekreis, which was in the Bromberg Region
  1. Bomst, seat at Bomst
  2. Fraustadt, seat at Fraustadt
  3. Meseritz, seat at Meseritz
  4. Netzekreis, seat at Schönlanke
  5. Schwerin an der Warthe, seat at Schwerin an der Warthe

From the former West Prussia:

- Rural districts (Kreise); all were formerly in the Marienwerder Region
  1. Deutsch Krone, seat at Deutsch Krone
  2. Flatow, seat at Flatow
  3. Schlochau, seat at Schlochau

== Administration ==
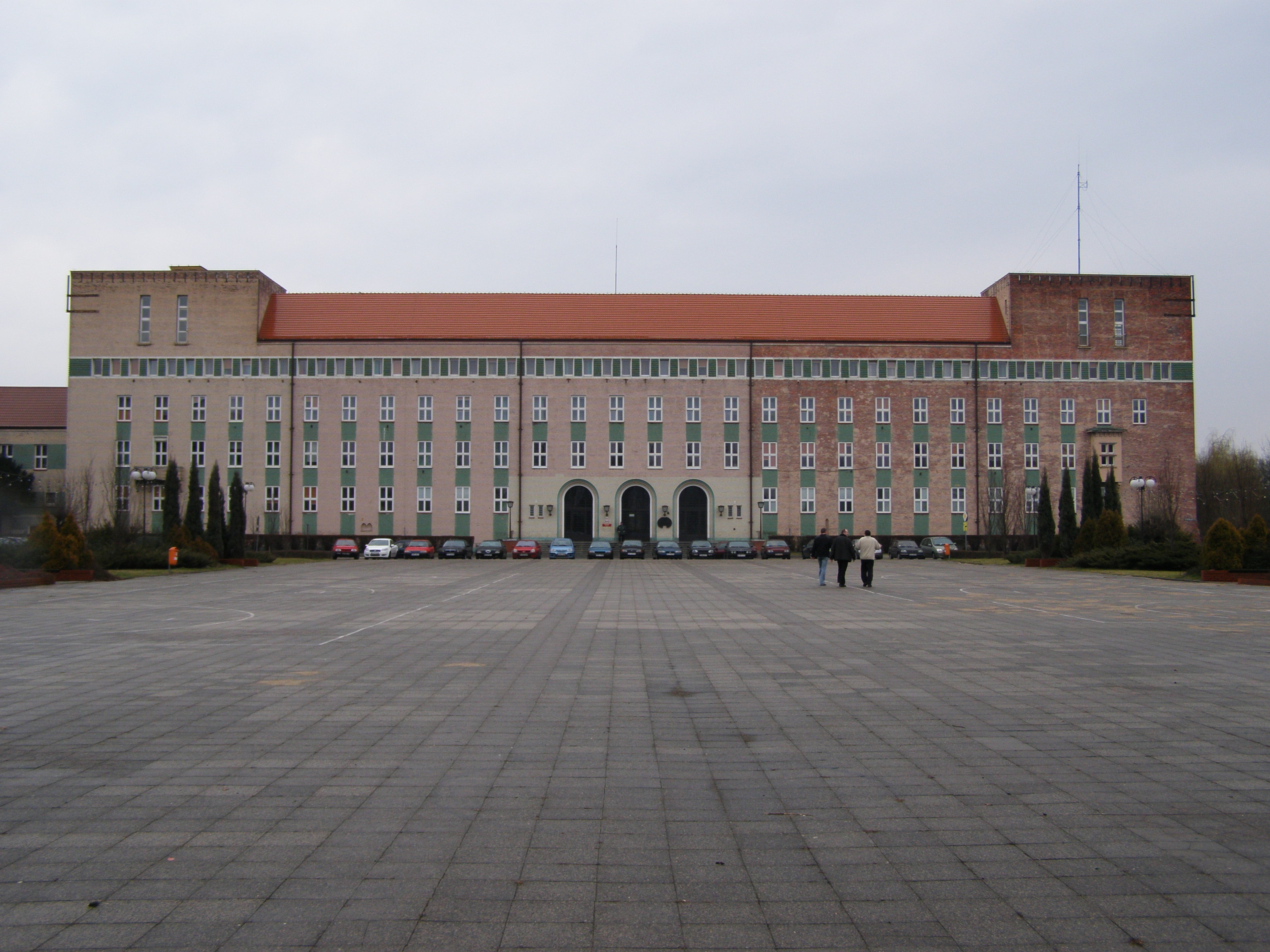
The former government building at Schneidemühl

The office of Oberpräsident appointed by the Prussian state government carried out central prerogatives on the provincial level and supervised the implementation of central policy on the lower levels of administration.

As to common interests and tasks to be fulfilled on the provincial level, such as schools, traffic installations, hospitals, cultural institutions, sanitary premises, jails etc., the urban and rural districts (Kreise) within each province (sometimes within each government region) formed a corporation with common assets to these ends, called Provinzialverband (provincial association, or – within government regions or smaller entities – Bezirksverband or Kommunalverband, i.e. municipal or regional associations). Since 1875 all provinces had this double identity, based first on central Prussian prerogatives from above and then on bottom-up corporations of province-wide or region-wide self-rule. Initially, the assemblies of the urban and rural districts elected representatives for the provincial parliaments (Provinziallandtage; or as to regional parliaments, the Kommunallandtage), which were thus indirectly elected.

After the end of the Prussian monarchy in 1918, the provincial or regional parliaments were all directly elected by the citizens of the provinces (or regions, respectively), with direct elections first held in 1921 and 1922. The parliaments legislated within the competencies transferred to the provincial or regional associations. Before the formal establishment of the new province, the rural and urban district assemblies elected representatives for the Kommunallandtag Posen–West Prussia, legislating within the competencies of the former Posen and West Prussia provincial associations and its premises within the territory of the future Posen–West Prussia. After the formal formation of the province, its parliament was called the provincial parliament of Posen–West Prussia, which elected a provincial executive body (government), the provincial committee (Provinzialausschuss), and a head of province, the Landeshauptmann.

=== Leaders ===
Governor (Oberpräsident)
Name	In office	Party	Notes
Friedrich von Bülow	1922–1933	German People's Party	
Hans von Meibom	1933	German National People's Party	
Wilhelm Kube	1933–1936	Nazi Party	also Oberpräsident of Brandenburg
Emil Stürtz	1936–1938	Nazi Party	also Oberpräsident of Brandenburg

Landeshauptmann
Name	In office	Party
Johannes Caspari	1922–1933	Social Democratic Party
Hans von Meibom	1933	Nazi Party

== Population ==
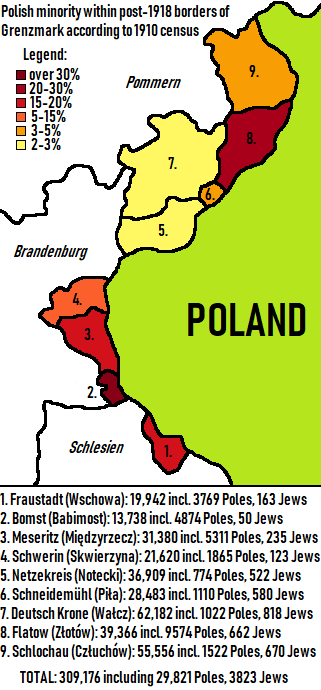
Polish minority in the districts of Posen–West Prussia

- 1910: 309,200 (in areas which later became parts of the province)
- 1919: 326,900
- 1925: 332,400
- 1933: 470,600

== Religion ==
Confessions
	Pct.
Protestant	62.4
Catholic	36.2
Jewish	1.0
Other	0.4

== Polish minority ==
After the Treaty of Versailles came into force, some members of the local Polish minority emigrated to Poland. In 1925, 13,284 people declared themselves to be either Polish-speaking or bilingual German/Polish, corresponding to a population share of 4.3%. The share of the vote of the Polish-Catholic People's Party was at around 3% in the elections in which it competed. The centres of the Polish minority were unevenly distributed. According to the census of 1925, the districts of Bomst (20.6%), Flatow (16.8%) and Meseritz (5.8%) had the highest proportions of Polish speakers (including bilinguals). A special achievement of the Polish minority was the establishment of a network of Polish private schools.

== See also ==
- Roman Catholic Territorial Prelature of Schneidemühl
