= Kreis Bomst =

Former district of Prussia

Location of Kreis Bomst

The district of Bomst was a Prussian district which existed from 1793 to 1807 in the province of South Prussia and from 1815 to 1938 successively in the Grand Duchy of Posen, the Province of Posen and the Frontier March of Posen-West Prussia. The district capital was Wollstein.

== History ==
After the Second Partition of Poland in 1793, the area around the towns of Bomst and Wollstein formed the Bomst district in the Prussian province of South Prussia. Through the Treaties of Tilsit, the Bomst district became part of the Duchy of Warsaw in 1807. After the Congress of Vienna, the district became part of the Grand Duchy of Posen in 1815, which became the Prussian Province of Posen in 1848. The province of Posen belonged to the newly founded German Empire from 18 January 1871.

In the course of district reforms, on 1 January 1818, the Bomst district ceded the area around the town of Neutomischel to the Buk district and the area around the town of Bentschen to the Meseritz district. In return, it received the area around Priment from the Fraustadt district.

On 27 December 1918 the Greater Poland uprising began in the province of Posen, and by the beginning of January 1919 the eastern part of the Bomst district was under Polish control. On 16 February 1919 an armistice ended the Polish-German fighting, and on 28 June 1919, with the signing of the Treaty of Versailles, the German government officially ceded the eastern two-thirds of the Bomst district to Poland. The western part of the Bomst district remained in Germany and became part of the Frontier March of Posen-West Prussia.

On 1 October 1938 the Bomst district was dissolved. The northern part of the district with the towns of Bomst and Unruhstadt was transferred to the district of Züllichau-Schwiebus in the Province of Brandenburg, while the southern part of the district was transferred to the district of Grünberg in the Province of Lower Silesia.

Division of Kreis Bomst in 1919

== Demographics ==
The Bomst district had a mixed population of Germans and Poles. The population of the district was almost evenly split between Germans and Poles. After the border change in 1919, in the part of the district that remained in Germany, there was a substantial Polish minority of 20.6% according to the 1925 census.

Ethnolinguistic structure of Kreis Bomst
Year	Population	German		Polish / Bilingual / Other	
1837	42,707	18,930	44.3%	23,777	55.7%
1846	48,352	26,882	55.6%	21,470	44.4%
1849	49,204	26,924	54.7%	22,280	45.3%
1852	51,402	27,359	53.2%	24,043	46.8%
1905	61,219	30,224	49.4%	30,995	50.6%
1910	63,120	30,980	49.1%	32,140	50.9%

== Elections ==
The Bomst district together with the Meseritz district formed the Posen 3 parliamentary constituency. In the Reichstag elections of the German Empire between 1871 and 1912, the following members were elected:

- 1871: Hans Wilhelm von Unruhe-Bomst, Free Conservative Party
- 1874: Hans Wilhelm von Unruhe-Bomst, Free Conservative Party
- 1877: Hans Wilhelm von Unruhe-Bomst, Free Conservative Party
- 1878: Hans Wilhelm von Unruhe-Bomst, Free Conservative Party
- 1881: Hans Wilhelm von Unruhe-Bomst, Free Conservative Party
- 1884: Hans Wilhelm von Unruhe-Bomst, Free Conservative Party
- 1887: Hans Wilhelm von Unruhe-Bomst, Free Conservative Party
- 1890: Hans Wilhelm von Unruhe-Bomst, Free Conservative Party
- 1893: Hans Wilhelm von Unruhe-Bomst, Free Conservative Party
- 1898: Stephan von Dziembowski-Bomst, Free Conservative Party
- 1903: Hans Otto von Gersdorff, German Conservative Party
- 1907: Hans Otto von Gersdorff, German Conservative Party
- 1912: Kuno von Westarp, German Conservative Party
