= Wiewiórka, Łódź Voivodeship =

Wiewiórka
- Village
- Location within Poland
- Coordinates: 51°12′39″N 18°14′4″E
- Country: Poland
- Voivodeship: Łódź
- County: Wieruszów
- Gmina: Bolesławiec

Wiewiórka [vjɛˈvjurka] is a village in the administrative district of Gmina Bolesławiec, within Wieruszów County, Łódź Voivodeship, in central Poland.
