= Chobot, Łódź Voivodeship =

Chobot
- Settlement
- Location within Poland
- Coordinates: 51°14′59″N 18°10′24″E
- Country: Poland
- Voivodeship: Łódź
- County: Wieruszów
- Gmina: Bolesławiec

Chobot [ˈxɔbɔt] is a settlement in the administrative district of Gmina Bolesławiec, within Wieruszów County, Łódź Voivodeship, in central Poland.
