= Gola, Gmina Szlichtyngowa =

Gola
- Village
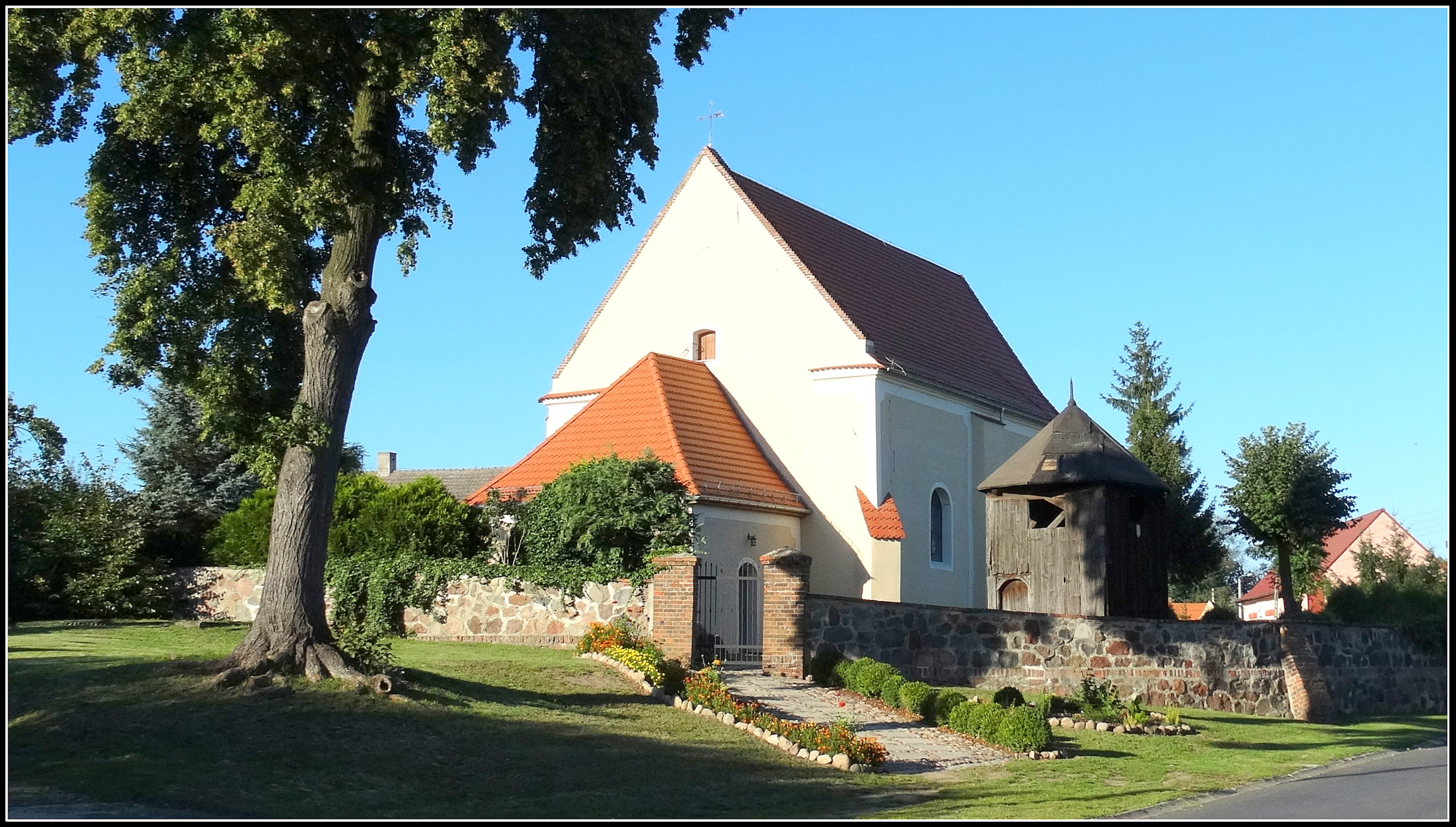

- Location within Poland
- Coordinates: 51°44′29″N 16°11′58″E
- Country: Poland
- Voivodeship: Lubusz
- County: Wschowa
- Gmina: Szlichtyngowa

Gola [ˈɡɔla] is a village in the administrative district of Gmina Szlichtyngowa, within Wschowa County, Lubusz Voivodeship, in western Poland.
