= Chobot (Strakonice District) =

- Municipality
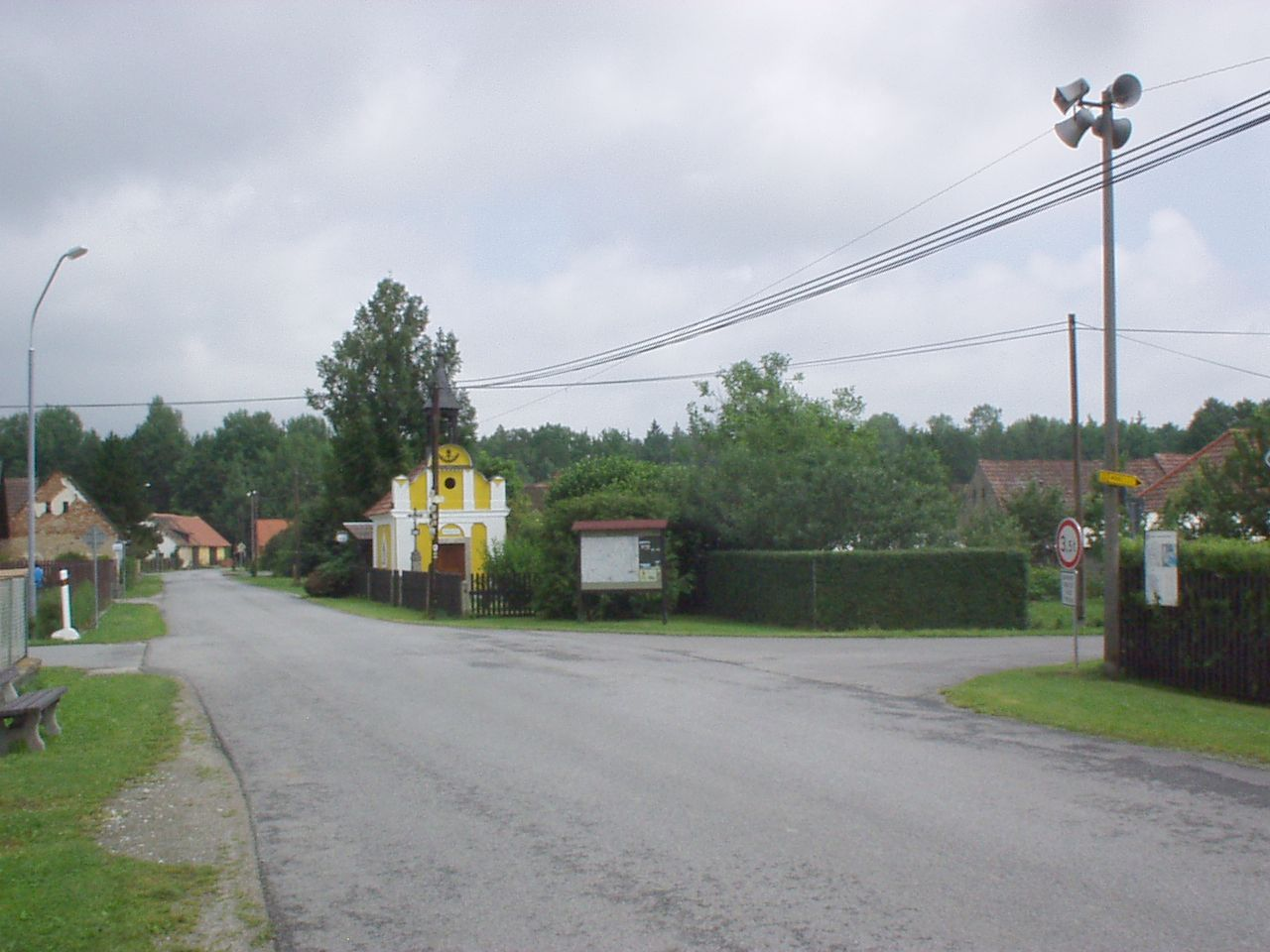
- Centre of Chobot

- Location in the Czech Republic
- Coordinates: 49°27′45″N 13°56′2″E
- Country: Czech Republic
- Region: South Bohemian
- District: Strakonice
- First mentioned: 1759

Area
  - Total: 2.32 km^{2} (0.90 sq mi)
- Elevation: 453 m (1,486 ft)

Population (2026-01-01)
  - Total: 39
  - Density: 17/km^{2} (44/sq mi)
- Time zone: UTC+1 (CET)
  - Summer (DST): UTC+2 (CEST)
- Postal code: 388 01
- Website: www.obecchobot.cz

Chobot is a municipality and village in Strakonice District in the South Bohemian Region of the Czech Republic. It has about 40 inhabitants.

Chobot lies approximately 23 kilometres (14 mi) north of Strakonice, 67 km (42 mi) north-west of České Budějovice, and 79 km (49 mi) south-west of Prague.

== Administrative division ==
Chobot consists of two municipal parts (in brackets population according to the 2021 census):

- Chobot (35)
- Újezd u Skaličan (8)

== Demographics ==
Historical population
Year	Pop.	±%
1869	344	—
1880	274	−20.3%
1890	221	−19.3%
1900	217	−1.8%
1910	237	+9.2%
1921	266	+12.2%
1930	181	−32.0%
1950	139	−23.2%
1961	119	−14.4%
1970	92	−22.7%
1980	71	−22.8%
1991	65	−8.5%
2001	54	−16.9%
2011	57	+5.6%
2021	43	−24.6%
Source: Censuses
