= Rosetti (company) =

Rosetti Handbags and Accessories Ltd. (simply known as Rosetti) designs, markets, and sells women's handbags, purses, and related accessories. Founded in 1994, the company is headquartered in New York City. Rosetti is an accessories fashion brand, in comparison to other fashion brands, such as Coach and Gucci.
