= Gmina Bolesławiec, Łódź Voivodeship =

Gmina Bolesławiec Bolesławiec Commune
- Gmina
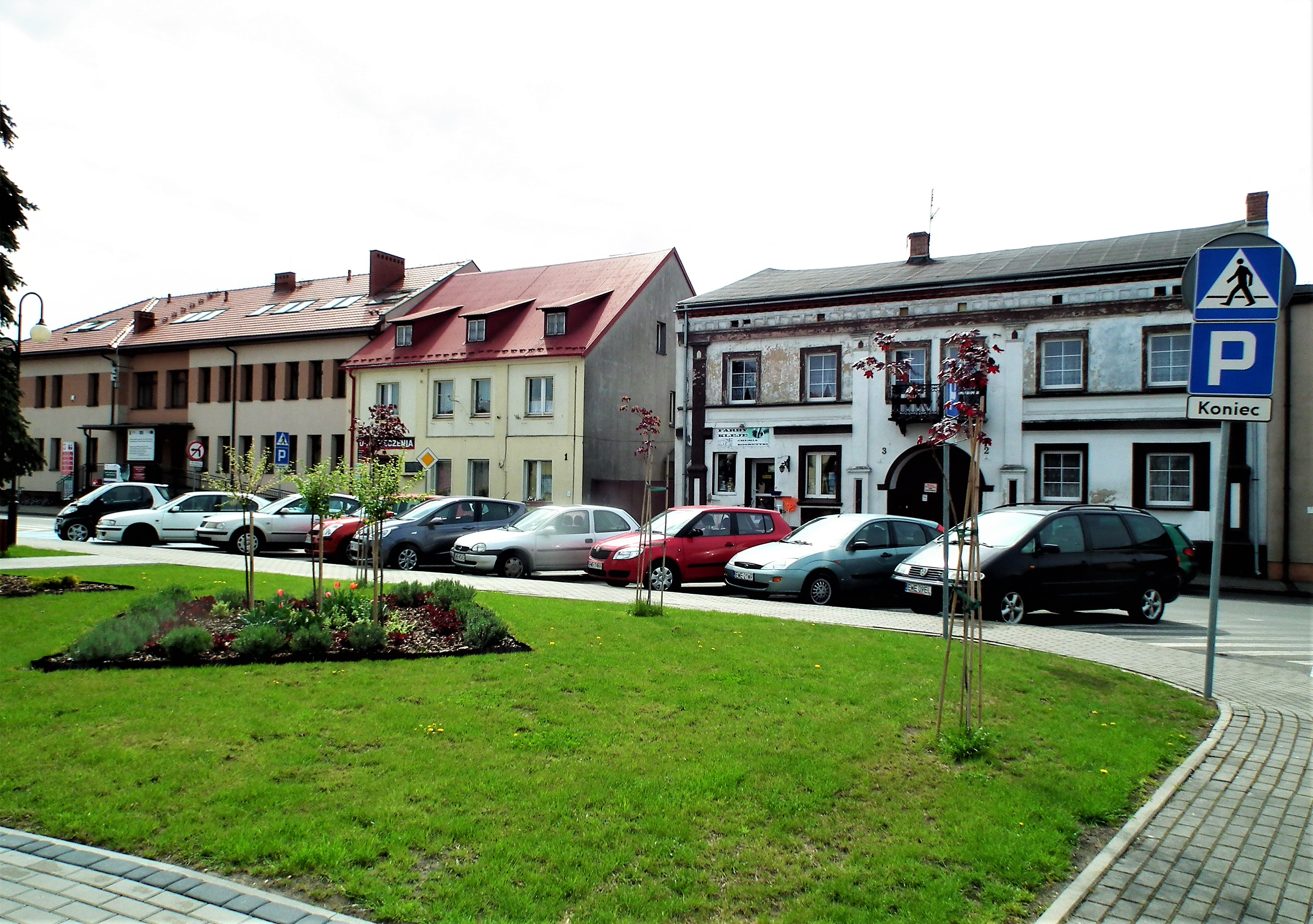

- Flag Coat of arms
- Interactive map of Gmina Bolesławiec
- Coordinates (Bolesławiec): 51°11′55″N 18°11′26″E
- Country: Poland
- Voivodeship: Łódź
- County: Wieruszów
- Seat: Bolesławiec

Area
  - Total: 64.58 km^{2} (24.93 sq mi)

Population (2006)
  - Total: 4,116
  - Density: 63.73/km^{2} (165.1/sq mi)
- Time zone: UTC+1 (CET)
  - Summer (DST): UTC+2 (CEST)
- Website: www.boleslawiec.net.pl

Gmina Bolesławiec is a rural gmina (administrative district) in Wieruszów County, Łódź Voivodeship, in central Poland. Its seat is the village of Bolesławiec, which lies approximately 12 kilometres (7 mi) south of Wieruszów and 110 km (68 mi) south-west of the regional capital Łódź.

The gmina covers an area of 64.58 square kilometres (24.9 sq mi), and as of 2006 its total population is 4,116.

== Villages ==
Gmina Bolesławiec contains the villages and settlements of:

- Bolesławiec
- Bolesławiec-Chróścin
- Chobot
- Chotynin
- Chróścin
- Chróścin-Młyn
- Chróścin-Zamek
- Gola
- Kamionka
- Koziołek
- Krupka
- Mieleszyn
- Piaski
- Podbolesławiec
- Podjaworek
- Stanisławówka
- Wiewiórka
- Żdżary

== Neighbouring gminas ==
Gmina Bolesławiec is bordered by the gminas of Byczyna, Czastary, Łęka Opatowska, Łubnice and Wieruszów.
