= Golay, Kutch =

Village in Gujarat, India

Coordinates: 23.447203°N 68.562369°E

Golay or Gholay is a village of Abdasa Taluka of Kutch district of Gujarat, India.

== History ==
Under the Chavda rule, it was known as Sarasgar Pattan, was, until superseded by Jakhau, a place of some importance.

About a mile west of Golay, is a domed stone and brick building, twenty-six feet square and twenty-eight high, said to be the tomb of Mod the son of Jakhara, and to have been built in the fourteenth century by his son Jam Manai II.
