= Jerzy Krupka =

Polish scientist

Jerzy Antoni Krupka (born in Cracovia on 7 April 1949) is a Polish scientist who works at both Warsaw University of Technology and University of Western Australia. The main areas of his research are related to measurements of electromagnetic properties of materials at microwave frequencies and computational electrodynamic. Measurement instruments intended for measurements of the complex permittivity, the complex permeability and conductivity of electronic materials at microwave frequencies developed by Jerzy Krupka are used worldwide in research institutions and industry. In 2012 he was elevated to the grade of IEEE Fellow for contributions to high-frequency measurements of electromagnetic properties of materials. His works were cited over 5000 times and brought him an h-index of 34.
