= Gola, Łódź Voivodeship =

Gola
- Village
- Location within Poland
- Coordinates: 51°9′24″N 18°12′41″E
- Country: Poland
- Voivodeship: Łódź
- County: Wieruszów
- Gmina: Bolesławiec

Gola [ˈɡɔla] is a village in the administrative district of Gmina Bolesławiec, within Wieruszów County, Łódź Voivodeship, in central Poland.
