= Gola (surname) =

Gola is a surname with multiple origins. Notable people with this surname include:

- Emilio Gola (1851–1923), Italian painter
- Ferré Gola (born 1976), Congolese musician
- José Gola (1904–1939), Argentine actor
- Loyiso Gola (born 1983), South African comedian
- Sisay Meseret Gola (born 1997), Ethiopian athlete
- Tom Gola (1933–2014), American basketball player
