= Górczyna, Wschowa County =

Górczyna
- Village
- Location within Poland
- Coordinates: 51°43′23″N 16°15′11″E
- Country: Poland
- Voivodeship: Lubusz
- County: Wschowa
- Gmina: Szlichtyngowa
- Population (2017): 524
- Time zone: UTC+1 (CET)
  - Summer (DST): UTC+2 (CEST)
- Postal code: 67-407
- Area code: +48 65
- Vehicle registration: FWS

Górczyna [ɡurˈt͡ʂɨna] is a village in the administrative district of Gmina Szlichtyngowa, within Wschowa County, Lubusz Voivodeship, in western Poland. It is located within the historic region of Greater Poland.

When part of the Kingdom of Poland, Górczyna was the center of the estate of the Szlichtyng family, including Jan Jerzy Szlichtyng, the founder of the nearby town of Szlichtyngowa.
