= Dab =

DAB, dab, dabs, or dabbing may refer to:

== Dictionaries ==
- Dictionary of American Biography, published under the auspices of the American Council of Learned Societies
- Dictionary of Australian Biography, published since 1949

== Places ==
- Dąb, Katowice, a district in southern Poland
- Dąb, Greater Poland Voivodeship, a village in west-central Poland
- Dąb, Lubusz Voivodeship, a village in west Poland
- Dąb, Warmian-Masurian Voivodeship, a village in northern Poland
- Dab, Chakwal, a village in Punjab, Pakistan

== Organizations ==
- Da Afghanistan Bank, central bank of Afghanistan
- Dansk Almennyttigt Boligselskab, a Danish non-profit housing association
- Defense Acquisition Board, a United States Department of Defense purchasing oversight board
- Democratic Alliance for the Betterment and Progress of Hong Kong, a political party in Hong Kong
- Dortmunder Actien Brauerei, a German brewery, manufacturer of DAB beer

=== Defunct organizations ===
- Dabs.com, a defunct British e-commerce retailer
- Danish Automobile Building, a former Danish bus manufacturer
- Deutsch-Asiatische Bank, a former foreign bank in China

== Science and technology ==
- Digital Audio Broadcasting, a digital radio transmission standard
- Dabbing, a method of making metal casts from a wooden block, related to stereotyping

=== Chemicals ===
- 3,3'-Diaminobenzidine or diaminobenzidine, commonly used in immunohistochemical staining
- 1,4-Diaminobutane
- 10-Deacetylbaccatin, or 10-DAB
- 4-Dimethylaminoazobenzene (methyl yellow), a pH indicator

== Other uses ==
- Dab (dance), a dance move
- Del Arno Band, Serbian and Yugoslav reggae band
- Daytona Beach International Airport's IATA airport code
- Common dab, a flatfish found in European coastal waters
- Directional asking bid, a contract bridge term
- Smoking or vaporizing hash oil
- Touching a foot to the ground in motorcycle trials

== See also ==
- Deb (disambiguation)
- D&B (disambiguation)
- Dąb (disambiguation)
- Dąb coat of arms, a Polish coat of arms
- Disambiguation
