= Dąb (disambiguation) =

Dąb is a district of Katowice in southern Poland.

Dąb may also refer to:

== Places ==
- Dąb, Greater Poland Voivodeship, west-central Poland
- Dąb, Lubusz Voivodeship, west Poland
- Dąb, Warmian-Masurian Voivodeship, north Poland

== Other uses ==
- Dąb coat of arms

== See also ==
- DAB (disambiguation)
- Sanie-Dąb, Podlaskie Voivodeship, north-eastern Poland
