= Lipinki, Lubusz Voivodeship =

Lipinki
- Village
- Location within Poland
- Coordinates: 51°50′34″N 16°3′19″E
- Country: Poland
- Voivodeship: Lubusz
- County: Wschowa
- Gmina: Sława
- Population: 620

Lipinki [lʲiˈpʲiŋkʲi] is a village in the administrative district of Gmina Sława, within Wschowa County, Lubusz Voivodeship, in western Poland. It is located approximately 5 km (3 mi) southwest of Sława, 18 km (11 mi) west of Wschowa, and 40 km (25 mi) east of Zielona Góra.
