= Jutrzenka =

Jutrzenka may refer to:

- Jutrzenka Kraków, a Jewish minority Polish football club during the interwar period
- Jutrzenka Polonia Bydgoszcz, speedway team
- Jutrzenka, Lubusz Voivodeship, a village in western Poland
- Jutrzenka, Pomeranian Voivodeship, a village in northern Poland
- Kozłowski WK.1 Jutrzenka, two-seat low wing monoplane designed and built in Poland
- Jutrzenka Vallis, valley on Venus
