= Spokojna =

- Village
- Location within Poland
- Coordinates: 51°56′21″N 16°06′10″E
- Country: Poland
- Voivodeship: Lubusz
- County: Wschowa
- Gmina: Sława
- Time zone: UTC+1 (CET)
  - Summer (DST): UTC+2 (CEST)
- Vehicle registration: FWS

Spokojna [spɔˈkɔi̯na] (German: Friedendorf) is a village in the administrative district of Gmina Sława, within Wschowa County, Lubusz Voivodeship, in western Poland.

== History ==
During World War II, in January 1945, the Germans committed a massacre of some 20 Jewish women, who were unable to further walk during a death march from a just dissolved subcamp of the Gross-Rosen concentration camp in Sława.
