= Łupice, Lubusz Voivodeship =

Łupice
- Village
- Location within Poland
- Coordinates: 51°58′N 16°6′E
- Country: Poland
- Voivodeship: Lubusz
- County: Wschowa
- Gmina: Sława

Population
  - Total: 779
- Time zone: UTC+1 (CET)
  - Summer (DST): UTC+2 (CEST)
- Vehicle registration: FWS

Łupice [wuˈpit͡sɛ] (German: Lupitze; 1937-1945: Ostweide) is a village in the administrative district of Gmina Sława, within Wschowa County, Lubusz Voivodeship, in western Poland.

The village has a population of 779.

== History ==
Łupice was a private church village, administratively located in the Kościan County in the Poznań Voivodeship in the Greater Poland Province of the Kingdom of Poland.

During the German evacuation from occupied Poland in the final stages of World War II, in January 1945, a German-perpetrated death march of Jewish women from a just dissolved subcamp of the Gross-Rosen concentration camp in Sława passed through the village.
