= Bagno, Lubusz Voivodeship =

Bagno
- Village
- Location within Poland
- Coordinates: 51°57′50″N 16°3′39″E
- Country: Poland
- Voivodeship: Lubusz
- County: Wschowa
- Gmina: Sława
- Population: 224

Bagno [ˈbaɡnɔ] is a village in the administrative district of Gmina Sława, within Wschowa County, Lubusz Voivodeship, in western Poland.
