= Gola, Gmina Sława =

Gola
- Village
- Location within Poland
- Coordinates: 51°54′04″N 16°02′28″E
- Country: Poland
- Voivodeship: Lubusz
- County: Wschowa
- Gmina: Sława
- Time zone: UTC+1 (CET)
  - Summer (DST): UTC+2 (CEST)
- Vehicle registration: FWS

Gola [ˈɡɔla] is a village in the administrative district of Gmina Sława, within Wschowa County, Lubusz Voivodeship, in western Poland.

Under Nazi Germany, it was renamed from Goile to Rodenheide in 1936 to erase traces of Polish origin.
