= Kamienna, Lubusz Voivodeship =

Kamienna
- Settlement
- Location within Poland
- Coordinates: 51°50′27″N 16°1′39″E
- Country: Poland
- Voivodeship: Lubusz
- County: Wschowa
- Gmina: Sława

Kamienna [kaˈmjɛnna] is a settlement in the administrative district of Gmina Sława, within Wschowa County, Lubusz Voivodeship, in western Poland.
