= Głuchów, Wschowa County =

Głuchów
- Settlement
- Location within Poland
- Coordinates: 51°51′16″N 16°0′49″E
- Country: Poland
- Voivodeship: Lubusz
- County: Wschowa
- Gmina: Sława

Głuchów [ˈɡwuxuf] is a settlement in the administrative district of Gmina Sława, within Wschowa County, Lubusz Voivodeship, in western Poland.
