= Lubiatów, Wschowa County =

Lubiatów
- Village
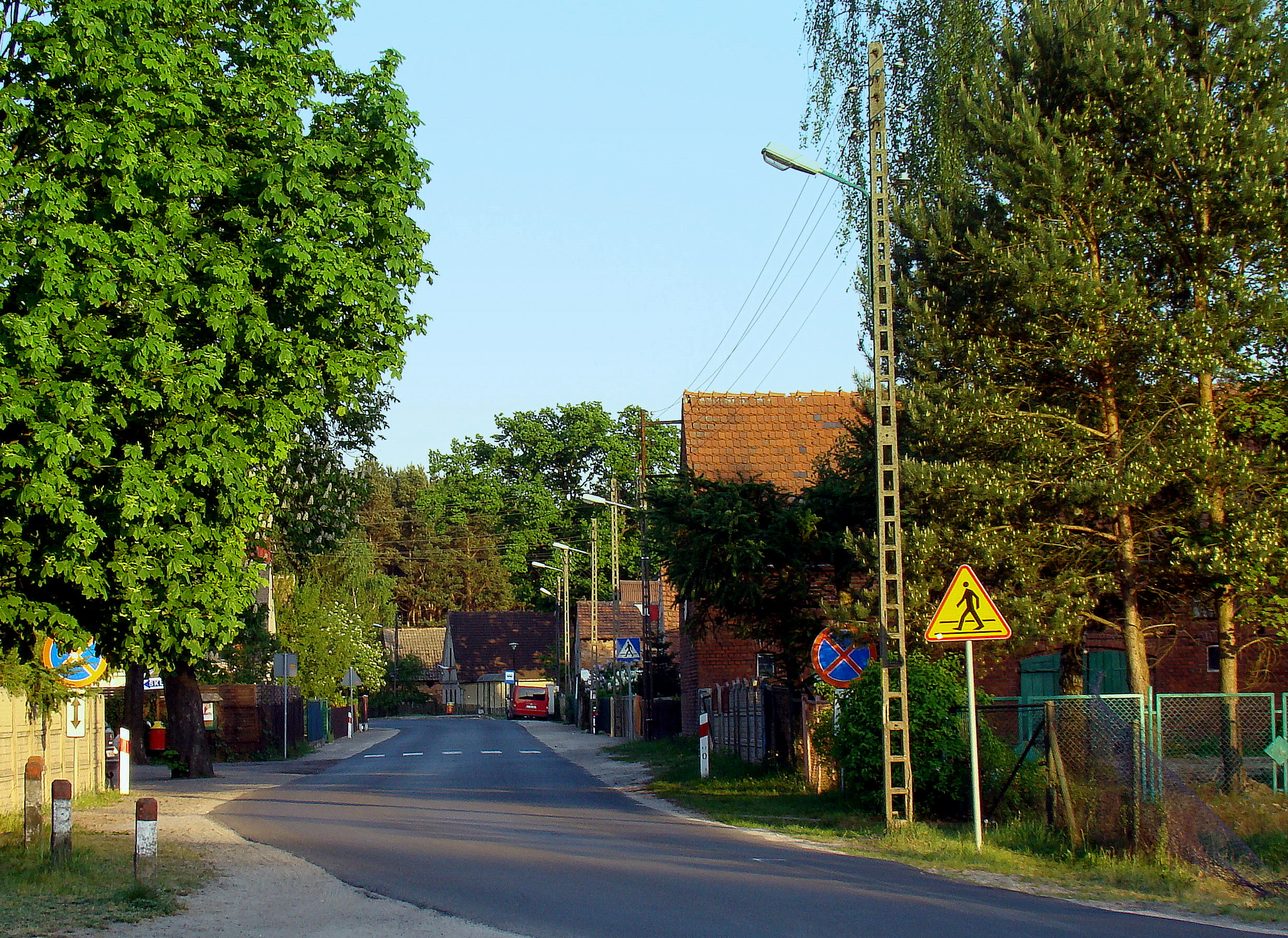
- Road in Lubiatów in 2009

- Location within Poland
- Coordinates: 51°55′14″N 15°58′21″E
- Country: Poland
- Voivodeship: Lubusz
- County: Wschowa
- Gmina: Sława
- Time zone: UTC+1 (CET)
  - Summer (DST): UTC+2 (CEST)

Lubiatów [luˈbjatuf] (German: Aufzug) is a village in the administrative district of Gmina Sława, within Wschowa County, Lubusz Voivodeship, in western Poland. It is situated on the north-western shore of Lake Sławskie.
