= Ciepielówek =

- Village
- Location within Poland
- Coordinates: 51°47′1″N 16°9′25″E
- Country: Poland
- Voivodeship: Lubusz
- County: Wschowa
- Gmina: Sława

Ciepielówek [t͡ɕɛpjɛˈluvɛk] is a village in the administrative district of Gmina Sława, within Wschowa County, Lubusz Voivodeship, in western Poland.

As of 2026, the village is uninhabited, with no permanent residents.
