= Krzydłowiczki =

- Village
- Location within Poland
- Coordinates: 51°49′23″N 16°08′16″E
- Country: Poland
- Voivodeship: Lubusz
- County: Wschowa
- Gmina: Sława

Krzydłowiczki [kʂɨdwɔˈvit͡ʂki] (German: Bergvorwerk) is a village in the administrative district of Gmina Sława, within Wschowa County, Lubusz Voivodeship, in western Poland.
