= Tarnówek, Wschowa County =

Tarnówek
- Settlement
- Location within Poland
- Coordinates: 51°48′40″N 16°7′9″E
- Country: Poland
- Voivodeship: Lubusz
- County: Wschowa
- Gmina: Sława

Tarnówek [tarˈnuvɛk] is a settlement in the administrative district of Gmina Sława, within Wschowa County, Lubusz Voivodeship, in western Poland.
