= Stare Strącze =

- Village
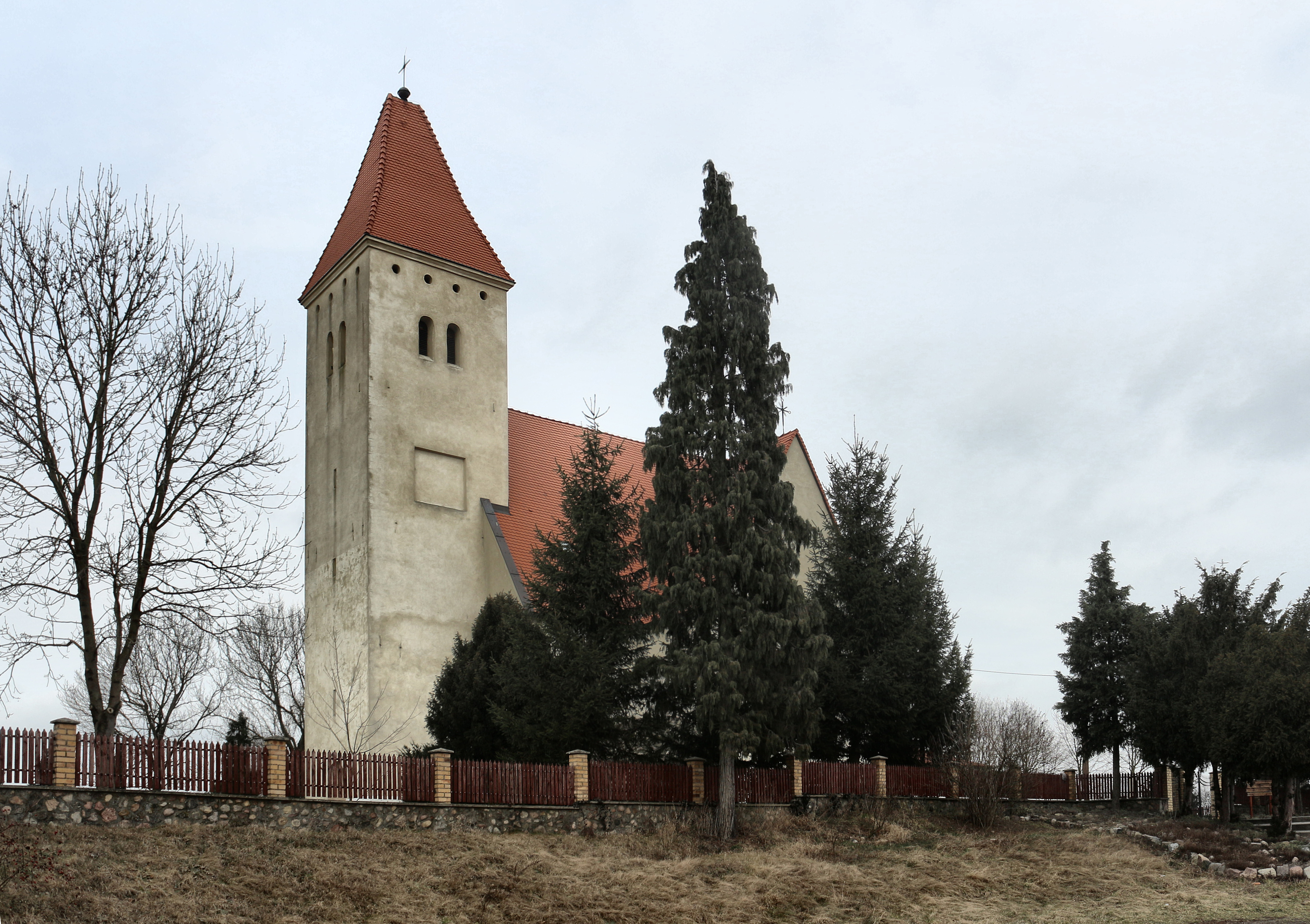
- Church in Stare Strącze

- Location within Poland
- Coordinates: 51°51′N 16°9′E
- Country: Poland
- Voivodeship: Lubusz
- County: Wschowa
- Gmina: Sława
- Population: 1,269

Stare Strącze [ˈstarɛ ˈstrɔnt͡ʂɛ] (German: Alt Strunz: 1937-1945: Deutscheck) is a village in the administrative district of Gmina Sława, within Wschowa County, Lubusz Voivodeship, in western Poland.

The village has a population of 1,269.
