= Dębowo, Lubusz Voivodeship =

Dębowo
- Settlement
- Location within Poland
- Coordinates: 51°55′11″N 16°1′21″E
- Country: Poland
- Voivodeship: Lubusz
- County: Wschowa
- Gmina: Sława

Dębowo [dɛmˈbɔvɔ] is a settlement in the administrative district of Gmina Sława, within Wschowa County, Lubusz Voivodeship, in western Poland.
