= Dębczyn =

- Settlement
- Location within Poland
- Coordinates: 51°48′41″N 16°03′15″E
- Country: Poland
- Voivodeship: Lubusz
- County: Wschowa
- Gmina: Sława

Dębczyn [ˈdɛmpt͡ʂɨn] is a settlement in the administrative district of Gmina Sława, within Wschowa County, Lubusz Voivodeship, in western Poland.
