= Lubogoszcz, Wschowa County =

Lubogoszcz
- Village
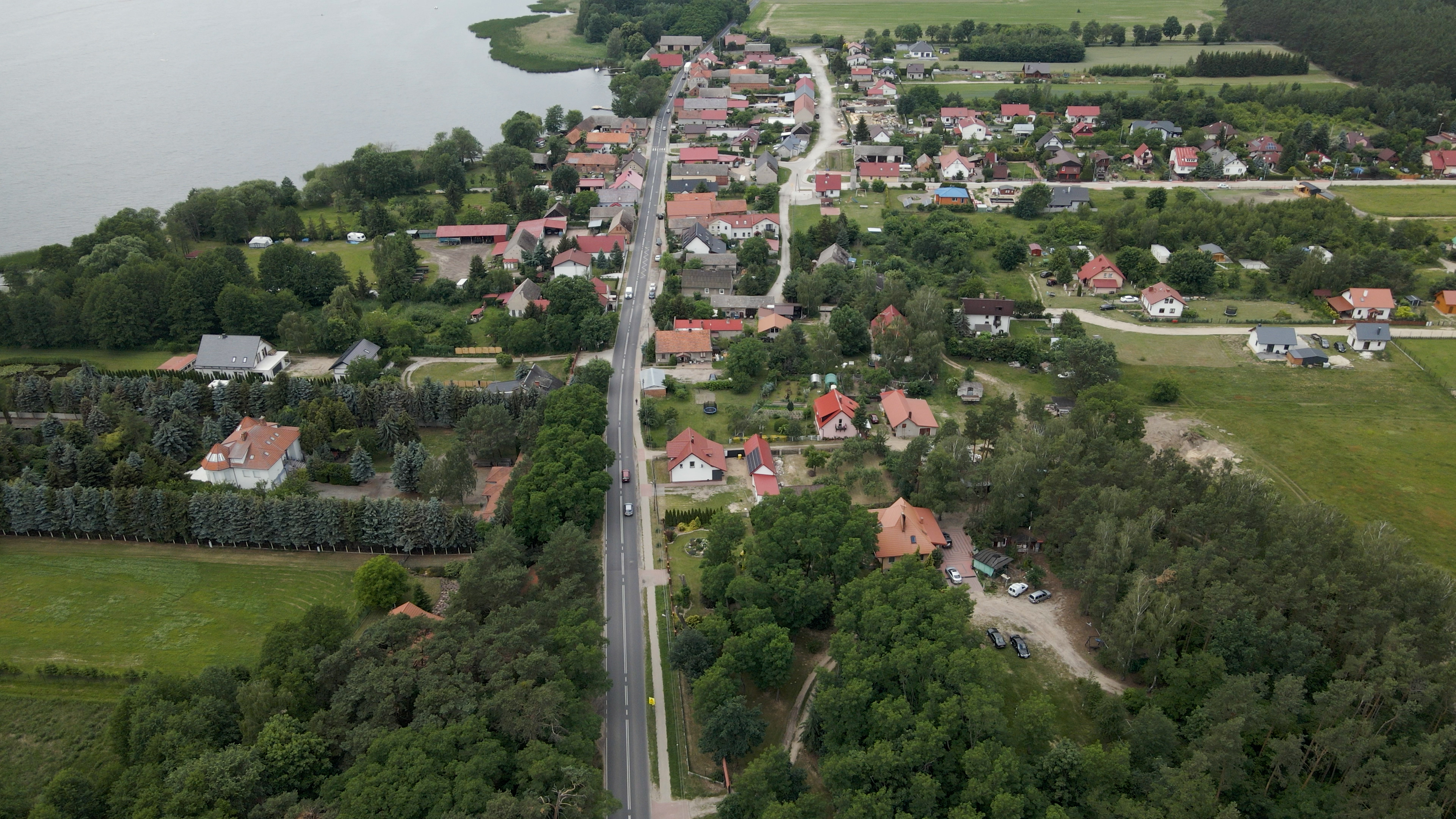
- Aerial view of Lubogoszcz in 2022

- Location within Poland
- Coordinates: 51°53′24″N 16°02′08″E
- Country: Poland
- Voivodeship: Lubusz
- County: Wschowa
- Gmina: Sława
- Time zone: UTC+1 (CET)
  - Summer (DST): UTC+2 (CEST)

Lubogoszcz [luˈbɔɡɔʂt͡ʂ] is a village in the administrative district of Gmina Sława, within Wschowa County, Lubusz Voivodeship, in western Poland. It is situated on the eastern shore of Lake Sławskie.
