= Tarnów Jezierny =

- Village
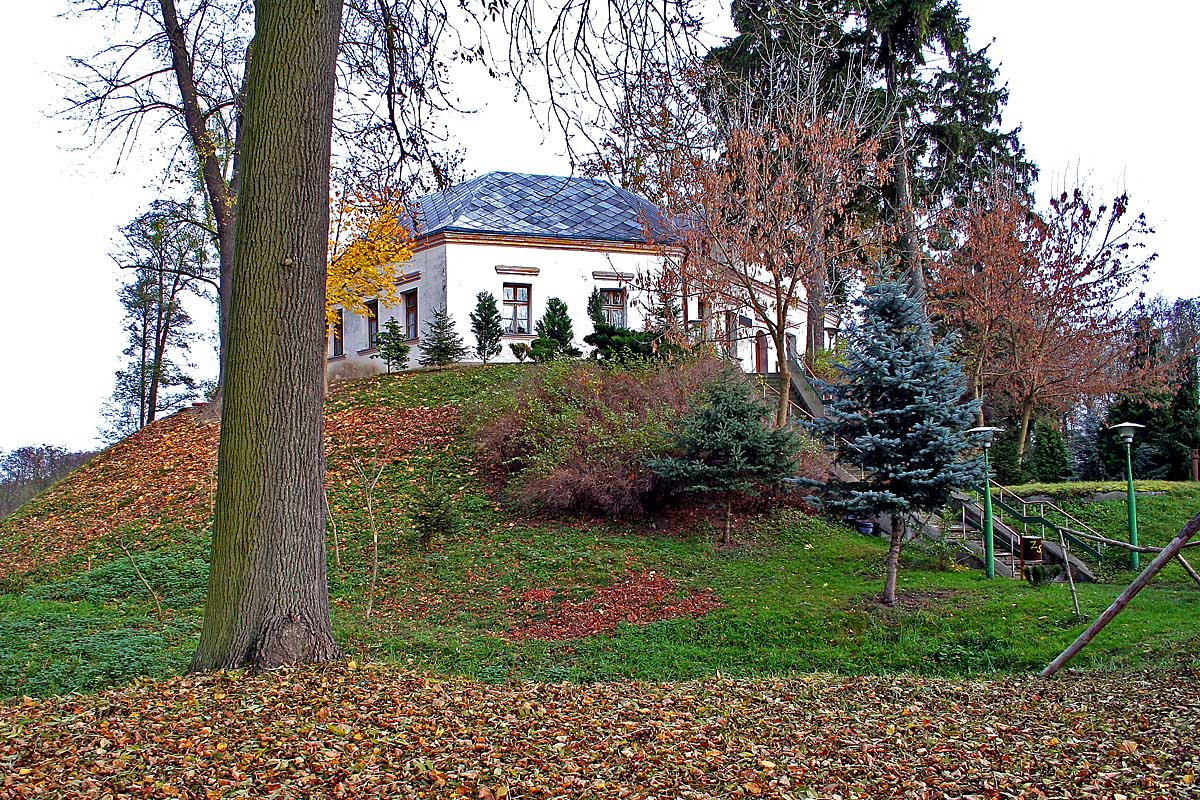
- Palace

- Location within Poland
- Coordinates: 51°52′N 15°58′E
- Country: Poland
- Voivodeship: Lubusz
- County: Wschowa
- Gmina: Sława
- Population: 100

Tarnów Jezierny [ˈtarnuf jɛˈʑɛrnɨ] (German: Tarnau) is a village in the administrative district of Gmina Sława, within Wschowa County, Lubusz Voivodeship, in western Poland.

The village has a population of 100.
