= Wróblów =

- Village
- Location within Poland
- Coordinates: 51°54′14″N 16°04′45″E
- Country: Poland
- Voivodeship: Lubusz
- County: Wschowa
- Gmina: Sława

Population
  - Total: 196

Wróblów [ˈvrubluf] (German: Sperlingswinkel) is a village in the administrative district of Gmina Sława, within Wschowa County, Lubusz Voivodeship, in western Poland.
