= Nowe Strącze =

- Village
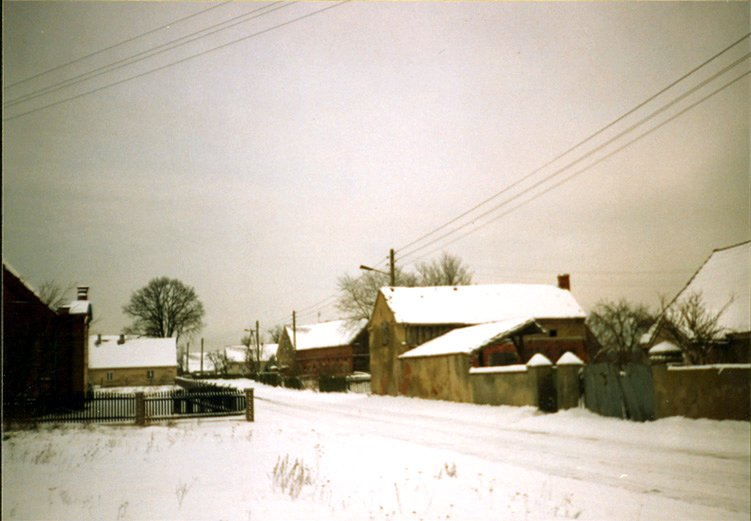
- View of Nowe Strącze in 1999

- Location within Poland
- Coordinates: 51°52′N 16°11′E
- Country: Poland
- Voivodeship: Lubusz
- County: Wschowa
- Gmina: Sława
- Population: 115

Nowe Strącze [ˈnɔvɛ ˈstrɔnt͡ʂɛ] (German: Neu Strunz) is a village in the administrative district of Gmina Sława, within Wschowa County, Lubusz Voivodeship, in western Poland.

The village has a population of 115.
