= Krzepielów =

- Village
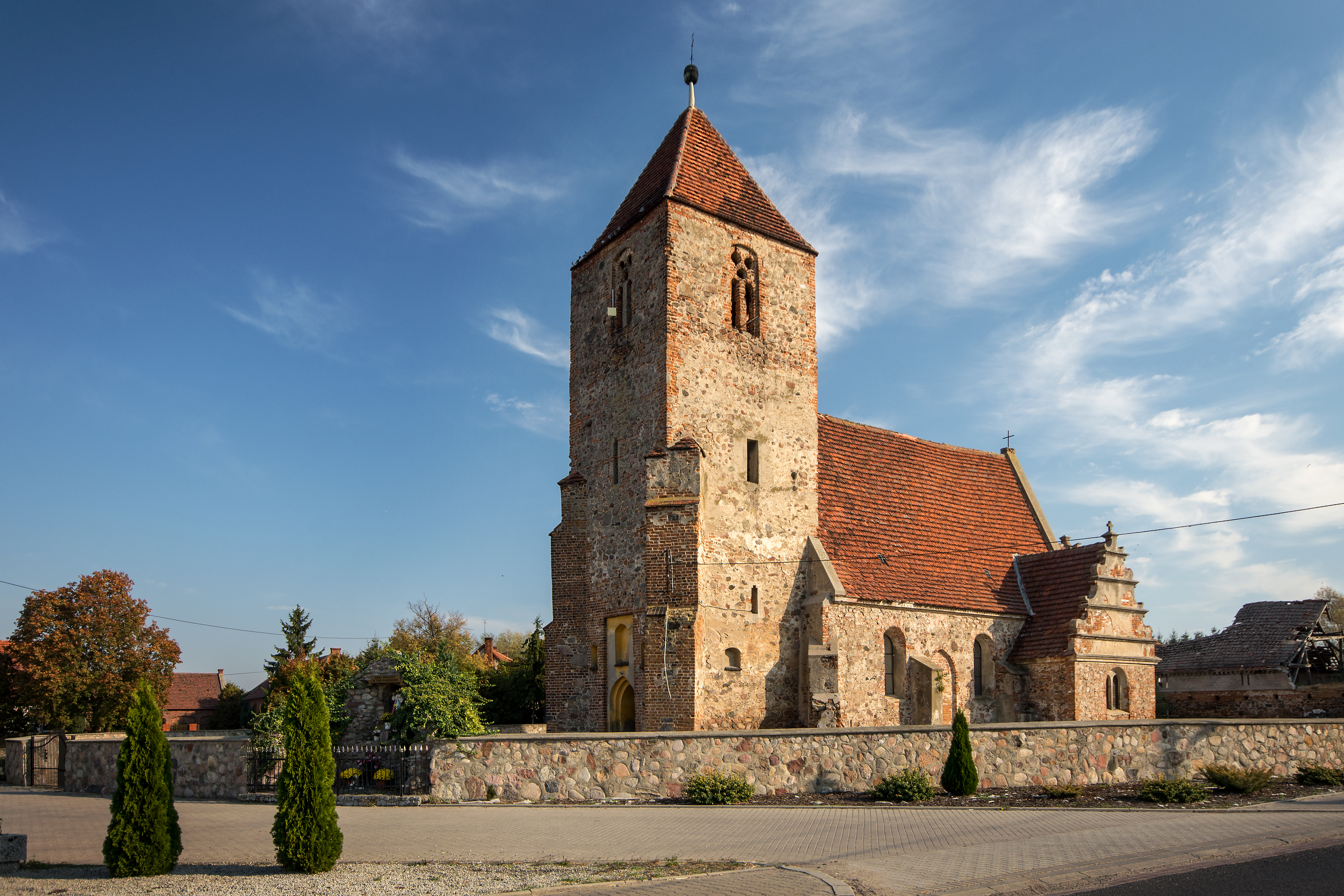
- Catholic church

- Location within Poland
- Coordinates: 51°47′21″N 16°06′08″E
- Country: Poland
- Voivodeship: Lubusz
- County: Wschowa
- Gmina: Sława

Krzepielów [kʂɛˈpjɛluf] (German: Tschlepplau; 1936-1945: Langemark) is a village in the administrative district of Gmina Sława, within Wschowa County, Lubusz Voivodeship, in western Poland.
