= Krążkowo, Lubusz Voivodeship =

Krążkowo
- Village
- Location within Poland
- Coordinates: 51°48′0″N 16°3′50″E
- Country: Poland
- Voivodeship: Lubusz
- County: Wschowa
- Gmina: Sława
- Population: 505

Krążkowo [krɔ̃ʂˈkɔvɔ] is a village in the administrative district of Gmina Sława, within Wschowa County, Lubusz Voivodeship, in western Poland.
