= Szreniawa =

Szreniawa may refer to:

- Szreniawa coat of arms
- Szreniawa, Greater Poland Voivodeship (west-central Poland)
- Szreniawa, Miechów County in Lesser Poland Voivodeship (south Poland)
- Szreniawa, Proszowice County in Lesser Poland Voivodeship (south Poland)
- Szreniawa, Lubusz Voivodeship (west Poland)
