= Śmieszkowo =

Śmieszkowo may refer to the following places:

- Śmieszkowo, Greater Poland Voivodeship (west-central Poland)
- Śmieszkowo, Lubusz Voivodeship (west Poland)
- Śmieszkowo, West Pomeranian Voivodeship (north-west Poland)
