= Przybyszów, Lubusz Voivodeship =

Przybyszów
- Village
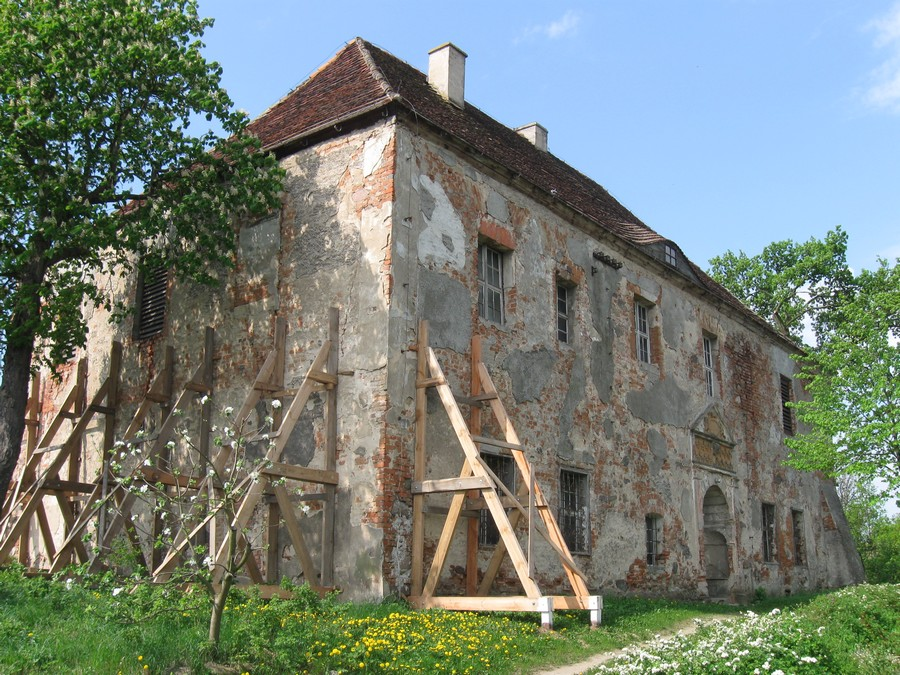
- Manor house in Przybyszów

- Location within Poland
- Coordinates: 51°53′12″N 16°07′24″E
- Country: Poland
- Voivodeship: Lubusz
- County: Wschowa
- Gmina: Sława
- Time zone: UTC+1 (CET)
  - Summer (DST): UTC+2 (CEST)
- Vehicle registration: FWS

Przybyszów [pʂɨˈbɨʂuf] (German: Pürschkau) is a village in the administrative district of Gmina Sława, within Wschowa County, Lubusz Voivodeship, in western Poland.

During World War II, the German government operated a women's subcamp of the Gross-Rosen concentration camp in the vicinity of the village.
