= Myszyniec, Lubusz Voivodeship =

Myszyniec
- Settlement
- Location within Poland
- Coordinates: 51°52′26″N 16°0′10″E
- Country: Poland
- Voivodeship: Lubusz
- County: Wschowa
- Gmina: Sława

Myszyniec [mɨˈʂɨɲɛt͡s] is a settlement in the administrative district of Gmina Sława, within Wschowa County, Lubusz Voivodeship, in western Poland.
