= Droniki =

- Village
- Location within Poland
- Coordinates: 51°56′30″N 16°00′41″E
- Country: Poland
- Voivodeship: Lubusz
- County: Wschowa
- Gmina: Sława

Droniki [drɔˈniki] is a village in the administrative district of Gmina Sława, within Wschowa County, Lubusz Voivodeship, in western Poland.
