= Radzyń, Lubusz Voivodeship =

Radzyń
- Village
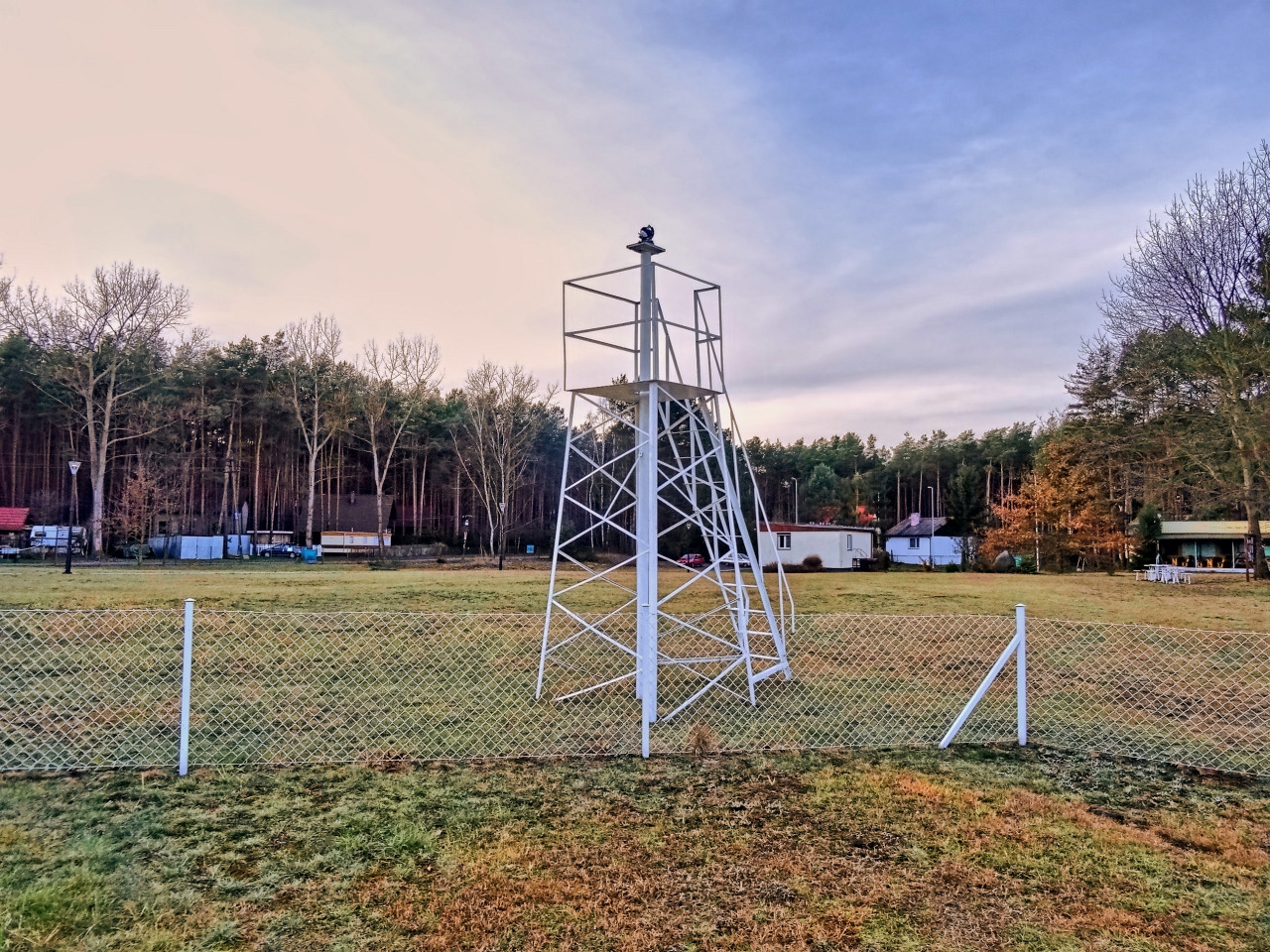
- Weather station in Radzyń in 2015

- Location within Poland
- Coordinates: 51°52′14″N 16°2′43″E
- Country: Poland
- Voivodeship: Lubusz
- County: Wschowa
- Gmina: Sława
- Time zone: UTC+1 (CET)
  - Summer (DST): UTC+2 (CEST)

Radzyń [ˈrad͡zɨɲ] (German: Rädchen) is a village in the administrative district of Gmina Sława, within Wschowa County, Lubusz Voivodeship, in western Poland. It is situated on the south-eastern shore of Lake Sławskie.
