= Krępina =

- Settlement
- Location within Poland
- Coordinates: 51°55′0″N 15°59′31″E
- Country: Poland
- Voivodeship: Lubusz
- County: Wschowa
- Gmina: Sława
- Time zone: UTC+1 (CET)
  - Summer (DST): UTC+2 (CEST)
- Vehicle registration: FWS

Krępina [krɛmˈpina] (German: Krempine, 1936-1945: Neuacker) is a settlement in the administrative district of Gmina Sława, within Wschowa County, Lubusz Voivodeship, in western Poland.
