= Cegłówko =

- Village
- Location within Poland
- Coordinates: 51°52′57″N 16°5′59″E
- Country: Poland
- Voivodeship: Lubusz
- County: Wschowa
- Gmina: Sława

Cegłówko [t͡sɛˈɡwufkɔ] is a village in the administrative district of Gmina Sława, within Wschowa County, Lubusz Voivodeship, in western Poland.
