= Ciosaniec, Lubusz Voivodeship =

Ciosaniec
- Village
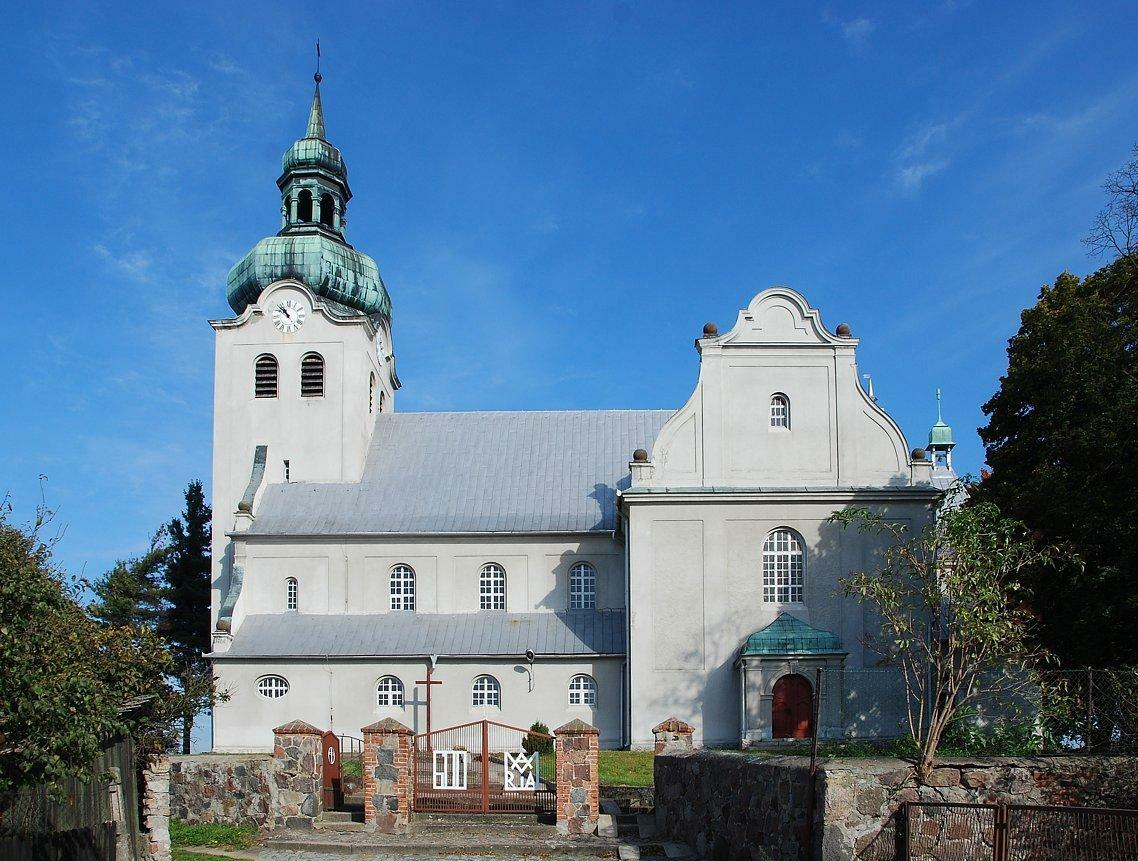
- Church of Saint Michael Archangel

- Location within Poland
- Coordinates: 51°57′N 16°2′E
- Country: Poland
- Voivodeship: Lubusz
- County: Wschowa
- Gmina: Sława

Population
  - Total: 647

Ciosaniec [t͡ɕɔˈsaɲɛt͡s] (German: Ostlinde; before 1937: Schussenze) is a village in the administrative district of Gmina Sława, within Wschowa County, Lubusz Voivodeship, in western Poland.

The village has a population of 647.
