= Kuźnica Głogowska =

- Village
- Location within Poland
- Coordinates: 51°52′N 16°1′E
- Country: Poland
- Voivodeship: Lubusz
- County: Wschowa
- Gmina: Sława

Kuźnica Głogowska (Polish: [kuʑˈɲit͡sa ɡwɔˈɡɔfska]; German: Hammer) is a village in the administrative district of Gmina Sława, within Wschowa County, Lubusz Voivodeship, in western Poland.
