= Szreniawa, Lubusz Voivodeship =

Szreniawa
- Village
- Location within Poland
- Coordinates: 51°56′N 16°3′E
- Country: Poland
- Voivodeship: Lubusz
- County: Wschowa
- Gmina: Sława

Szreniawa [ʂrɛˈɲava] (German: Schenawe, 1937-1945: Schönforst) is a village in the administrative district of Gmina Sława, within Wschowa County, Lubusz Voivodeship, in western Poland.
