= Sanie =

Sanie may refer to the following.

- Sanie language
- Sanie, Lower Silesian Voivodeship (south-west Poland)
- Sanie, Łódź Voivodeship (central Poland)

== See also ==
- Sanie-Dąb, Podlaskie Voivodeship (north-eastern Poland)
