= Gmina Sława =

Gmina Sława Sława Commune
- Gmina
- Coat of arms
- Interactive map of Gmina Sława
- Coordinates (Sława): 51°53′N 16°5′E
- Country: Poland
- Voivodeship: Lubusz
- County: Wschowa
- Seat: Sława

Area
  - Total: 326.78 km^{2} (126.17 sq mi)

Population (2019-06-30)
  - Total: 12,745
  - Density: 39.002/km^{2} (101.01/sq mi)
  - Urban: 4,321
  - Rural: 8,424
- Website: http://www.slawa.pl

Gmina Sława is an urban-rural gmina (administrative district) in Wschowa County, Lubusz Voivodeship, in western Poland. Its seat is the town of Sława, which lies approximately 18 kilometres (11 mi) north-west of Wschowa and 41 km (25 mi) east of Zielona Góra.

The gmina covers an area of 326.78 square kilometres (126.2 sq mi), and as of 2019 its total population is 12,745.

== Villages ==
Apart from the town of Sława, Gmina Sława contains the villages and settlements of Bagno, Cegłówko, Ciepielówek, Ciosaniec, Dąb, Dębczyn, Dębowo, Droniki, Głuchów, Gola, Jutrzenka, Kamienna, Krążkowo, Krępina, Krzepielów, Krzydłowiczki, Kuźnica Głogowska, Lipinki, Lubiatów, Lubogoszcz, Łupice, Myszyniec, Nowe Strącze, Przybyszów, Przydroże, Radzyń, Śmieszkowo, Spokojna, Stare Strącze, Szreniawa, Tarnów Jezierny, Tarnówek and Wróblów.

== Neighbouring gminas ==
Gmina Sława is bordered by the gminas of Kolsko, Kotla, Nowa Sól, Przemęt, Siedlisko, Szlichtyngowa, Wijewo, Wolsztyn and Wschowa.

== Twin towns – sister cities ==
Gmina Sława is twinned with:

- Esneux, Belgium
- Luckau, Germany
