= Jutrzenka, Lubusz Voivodeship =

Jutrzenka
- Settlement
- Location within Poland
- Coordinates: 51°51′13″N 16°5′25″E
- Country: Poland
- Voivodeship: Lubusz
- County: Wschowa
- Gmina: Sława

Jutrzenka [juˈtʂɛnka] is a settlement in the administrative district of Gmina Sława, within Wschowa County, Lubusz Voivodeship, in western Poland.
