= Sanie-Dąb =

- Village
- Location within Poland
- Coordinates: 52°59′46″N 22°22′46″E
- Country: Poland
- Voivodeship: Podlaskie
- County: Zambrów
- Gmina: Kołaki Kościelne
- Postal code: 18-315
- Vehicle registration: BZA

Sanie-Dąb [ˈsaɲɛ ˈdɔmp] is a village in the administrative district of Gmina Kołaki Kościelne, within Zambrów County, Podlaskie Voivodeship, in north-eastern Poland.

Four Polish citizens were murdered by Nazi Germany in the village during World War II.

== See also ==
- Dąb, places named Dąb
- Sanie, places named Sanie
