= Ostrovia II =

General information
- Type: Two seat sports aircraft
- National origin: Poland
- Manufacturer: Josef Morison (or Moryson)
- Designer: Josef Morison (or Moryson)
- Number built: 1

History
- First flight: 24 September 1930
- Developed from: Ostrovia I

The Ostrovia II or Moryson II was a 1930s Polish club trainer aircraft, a development of the Ostrovia I. Only one was built and was used by the Poznań flying club for five years.

== Design and development ==
In 1929 Jozef Morisson (sometimes written Moryson) designed a significantly revised version of the Ostrovia I which he named the Ostrovia II. It was built with funding from LOPP and first flew on 24 September 1930.

Like the Ostrovia I, the new design had a low cantilever wing built around two spars, but it employed a blend of four different airfoil sections and was tapered in plan. It was built in three parts, a centre-section which contained the two fuel tanks and two outer panels. Plywood covered the underside and leading edge, with fabric covering elsewhere. Compared with the Ostrovia I, the wing area was increased by 12%%. The outer panels could be folded back on rear-spar hinges along the fuselage for road transport; when folded the width was 2.9 m (9.5 ft).

The Ostrovia II was initially powered by a 60–71 kW (80–95 hp) Armstrong-Siddeley Genet five-cylinder radial engine which was mounted on the nose uncowled. Sometime after September 1931 this was replaced by a 63 kW (85 hp) Cirrus III four-cylinder upright inline with its enclosed air-cooled cylinders projecting well above the nose. Like the Ostrovia I, the Ostrovia II had a rectangular section fuselage based on four longerons and was ply covered. Its two open cockpits were in tandem and fitted with dual control. Originally the empennage was square tipped, with ply covered fin and rudder but with fabric-covered horizontal surfaces. Later these angular surfaces were revised to have rounded tips. The tailplane could be adjusted in flight.

The fixed landing gear of the Ostrovia II was more aerodynamically refined than that of its predecessor. It was of the divided type, with mainwheels on two cranked axles hinged from the centerline of the fuselage underside with their ends attached via rubber chord shock absorbers to steel-tube V-struts from the lower longerons.

== Operational history ==
After successful flight trials the Ostrovia II was used by the Poznań flying club for five years. It competed under Genet power in the Fourth National Lightplane Contest in September 1931, coming eleventh out of twenty-two. After the installation of the Cirrus engine it took part in several national meetings, though without distinction.

== Variants ==
- Ostrovia II; Also known as the Moryson II, as described.
- Moryson III; Powered by a 63 kW (85 hp) Walter Vega it was completed in 1935 but was refused a permit to fly because of constructional and other problems.
- Moryson IV; An unbuilt cabin version with a more powerful engine.

== Specifications ==
Data from Cynk (1971) except where noted

General characteristics

- Crew: One pilot
- Capacity: One passenger
- Length: 6 m (19 ft 8 in)
- Wingspan: 10.5 m (34 ft 5 in)
- Height: 2.5 m (8 ft 2 in)
- Wing area: 15 m^{2} (160 sq ft)
- Empty weight: 350 kg (772 lb)
- Max takeoff weight: 650 kg (1,433 lb)
- Fuel capacity: 160 L (35 imp gal; 42 US gal) (main tanks)
- Powerplant: 1 × Armstrong-Siddeley Genet 5-cylinder radial, 60 kW (80 hp)
- Propellers: 2-bladed

Performance

- Maximum speed: 180 km/h (110 mph, 97 kn) at sea level
- Cruise speed: 150 km/h (93 mph, 81 kn)
- Stall speed: 78 km/h (48 mph, 42 kn)
- Range: 750 km (470 mi, 400 nmi)
- Service ceiling: 4,000 m (13,000 ft)
- Rate of climb: 3.2 m/s (630 ft/min)
