= Śmieszkowo, Lubusz Voivodeship =

Śmieszkowo
- Village
- Location within Poland
- Coordinates: 51°54′55″N 16°5′46″E
- Country: Poland
- Voivodeship: Lubusz
- County: Wschowa
- Gmina: Sława

Śmieszkowo [ɕmjɛʂˈkɔvɔ] (German: Lache) is a village in the administrative district of Gmina Sława, within Wschowa County, Lubusz Voivodeship, in western Poland.
