= Dąb, Lubusz Voivodeship =

Dąb
- Village
- Location within Poland
- Coordinates: 51°54′13″N 16°0′52″E
- Country: Poland
- Voivodeship: Lubusz
- County: Wschowa
- Gmina: Sława

Dąb [dɔmp] is a village in the administrative district of Gmina Sława, within Wschowa County, Lubusz Voivodeship, in western Poland.
