= Kozłowski WK.1 Jutrzenka =

Type of aircraft

WK.1 Jutrzenka
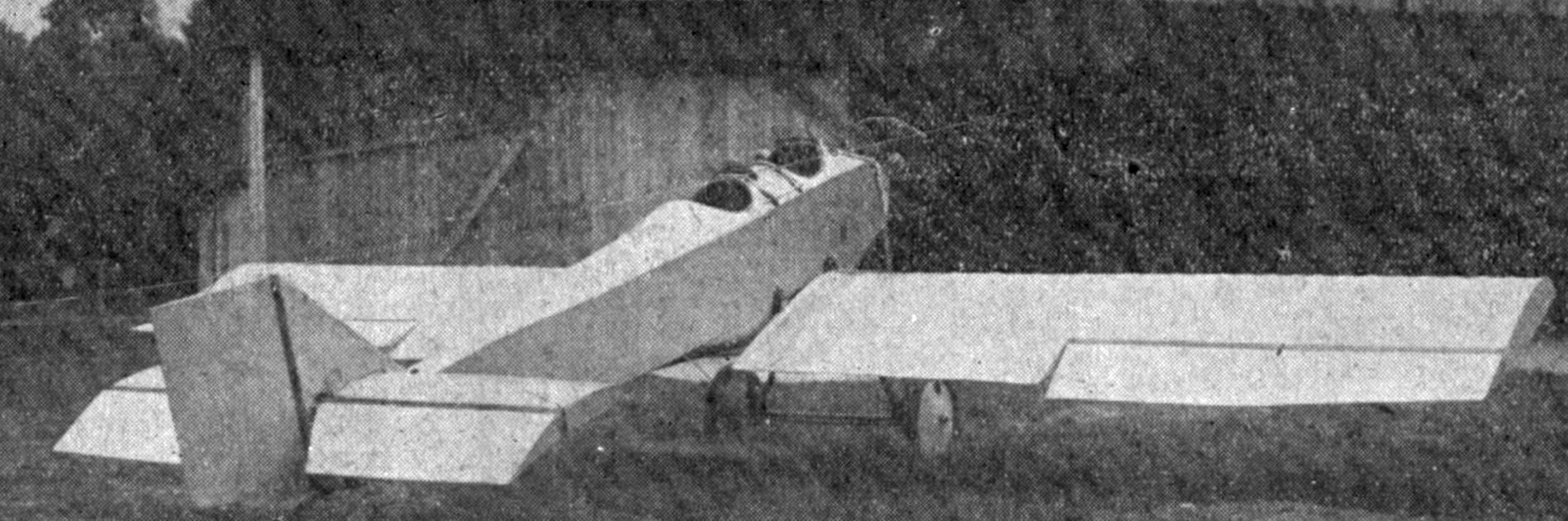

General information
- Type: Two seat sports
- National origin: Poland
- Designer: Władysław Kozłowski
- Number built: 2

History
- First flight: 18 September 1927
- Variant: Ostrovia II

The all-wood Kozłowski WK.1 Jutrzenka (Dawn) was a two-seat low wing monoplane designed and built in Poland over 1926-7.

== Design and development ==
Around 1925 Władysław Korbel published a series of articles on home-built light aircraft which encouraged Władysław Kozłowski and his brother Jerzy to design a tandem two-seater. The plans were checked by Korbel and building began with the help of two friends and with funds the brothers had raised through social functions. The airframe was completed by the summer of 1926 with funds from L.O.P.P. but its Anzani 6 engine did not arrive until the following summer; the first flight was made on either 10 or 18 September 1927, piloted by Stanisław Czyzewski.

The Jutrzenka's one-piece wing, built around two spars and fabric covered, had a rectangular plan. It was bolted directly to the bottom of the lower fuselage longerons. Tapered ailerons occupied more than half the trailing edge.

It was powered by a six-cylinder, 34 kW (45 hp) Anzani 6 radial engine, mounted uncowled in the aluminium-covered nose. Behind it, the rectangular cross-section fuselage was plywood-covered and flat-sided apart from curved decking. There were two open cockpits, equipped with dual control, in tandem over the wing. When the Jutrzenka first appeared in 1927, the decking was shallow and the cockpits simple openings apart from windscreens but over the winter of 1927-8 it was deepened, producing scooped cockpits with streamlining behind them and with crash protection and headrests for the crew.

Its narrow chord tailplane, mounted on top of the fuselage, was rectangular in plan with and carried separate, rectangular but much broader elevators. The fin was triangular and the rudder rectangular. All the tail surfaces were ply-covered.

The fixed undercarriage of the Jutrzenka had mainwheels on a single axle, rubber cord sprung to a pair of V-struts from the lower fuselage.

== Operational history ==
After its first flight the Jutrzenka rapidly passed its flight trials and was entered into the First National Lightplane Contest, held in Warsaw at the start of October 1927. It finished in third place.

In 1928 it was operated by the Warsaw Academic Aeroclub and competed in the Second National Lightplane Contest, held a year later, flown by Mazurek. Engine problems left it unclassified.

A second airframe was started by a pair of schoolboys from Wilmo, following plans provided by the Kozłowskis, but it was not completed. The brothers also provided Jozef Morrison (sometimes written Moryson) and Jozef Nawrot with plans, from which they built a WK.1 with the low upper fuselage of the early aircraft but including the crash cabane of the 1928 aircraft, though unfaired. This was named the Ostrovia I, after a Polish football team, though it was also known as the Moryson I. It had the same Anzani 6 as the Jutrzenka, was about 9% lighter and, according to its builder, a little faster and higher-flying.

Piloted by Stanisław Czyzewski, the Ostrovia I first flew in July 1928. He also flew it at the Second National Lightplane Contest, competing with the Jutrzenka, but only managed to be placed eleventh out of fourteen.

== Specifications (Jutrzenka) ==
Data from Cynk, 1971 unless noted

General characteristics

- Crew: One pilot
- Capacity: One passenger
- Length: 6.1 m (20 ft 0 in)
- Wingspan: 9.3 m (30 ft 6 in)
- Height: 2 m (6 ft 7 in)
- Wing area: 14.2 m^{2} (153 sq ft)
- Empty weight: 325 kg (717 lb)
- Gross weight: 500 kg (1,102 lb)
- Powerplant: 1 × Anzani 6 6-cylinder radial, 34 kW (45 hp)
- Propellers: 2-bladed

Performance

- Maximum speed: 130 km/h (81 mph, 70 kn) at sea level
- Cruise speed: 90 km/h (56 mph, 49 kn)
- Stall speed: 72 km/h (45 mph, 39 kn) minimum speed
- Range: 400 km (250 mi, 220 nmi)
- Service ceiling: 3,000 m (9,800 ft) or 1,275 m (4,183 ft)
- Time to altitude: 33 min to 2,000 m (6,600 ft)
