= Dansk Almennyttigt Boligselskab =

DAB (Dansk Almennyttigt Boligselskab) is a Danish non-profit public housing authority founded in 1942. In 2025 it merged with Lejerbo to become DAB-Lejerbo, the largest public housing body in the country.

== History ==
Dansk Almennyttigt Boligselskab, later known by its initials as DAB, was founded in 1942 in response to the housing shortage in occupied Denmark. Politically independent, it was chartered as a limited liability company (aktieselskab) underwritten by 200,000 kroner in share capital. Its initial aim was to build family housing with garden access, and in the 1950s and 1960s it built many low-density housing developments. Director Erling Knudsen hired the architecture firm of Hoff & Windinge, who designed notable developments for DAB such as Søndergård Park in Bagsværd. With government support, it became integrated into the housing policy of the Danish welfare state. At its peak it administered 50,000 dwellings.

Effective 1 June 2025, DAB was merged with Lejerbo, another large public housing authority, whose origins, unlike DAB's, lay in the cooperative labour movement. The merged DAB-Lejerbo is the largest public housing body in Denmark, administering approximately 95,000 dwellings and more than 100 housing organisations in 75 of the 98 Danish municipalities. DAB-Lejerbo will initially have joint headquarters in Valby and in Frederiksberg.
