= Dąb, Warmian-Masurian Voivodeship =

Dąb
- Village
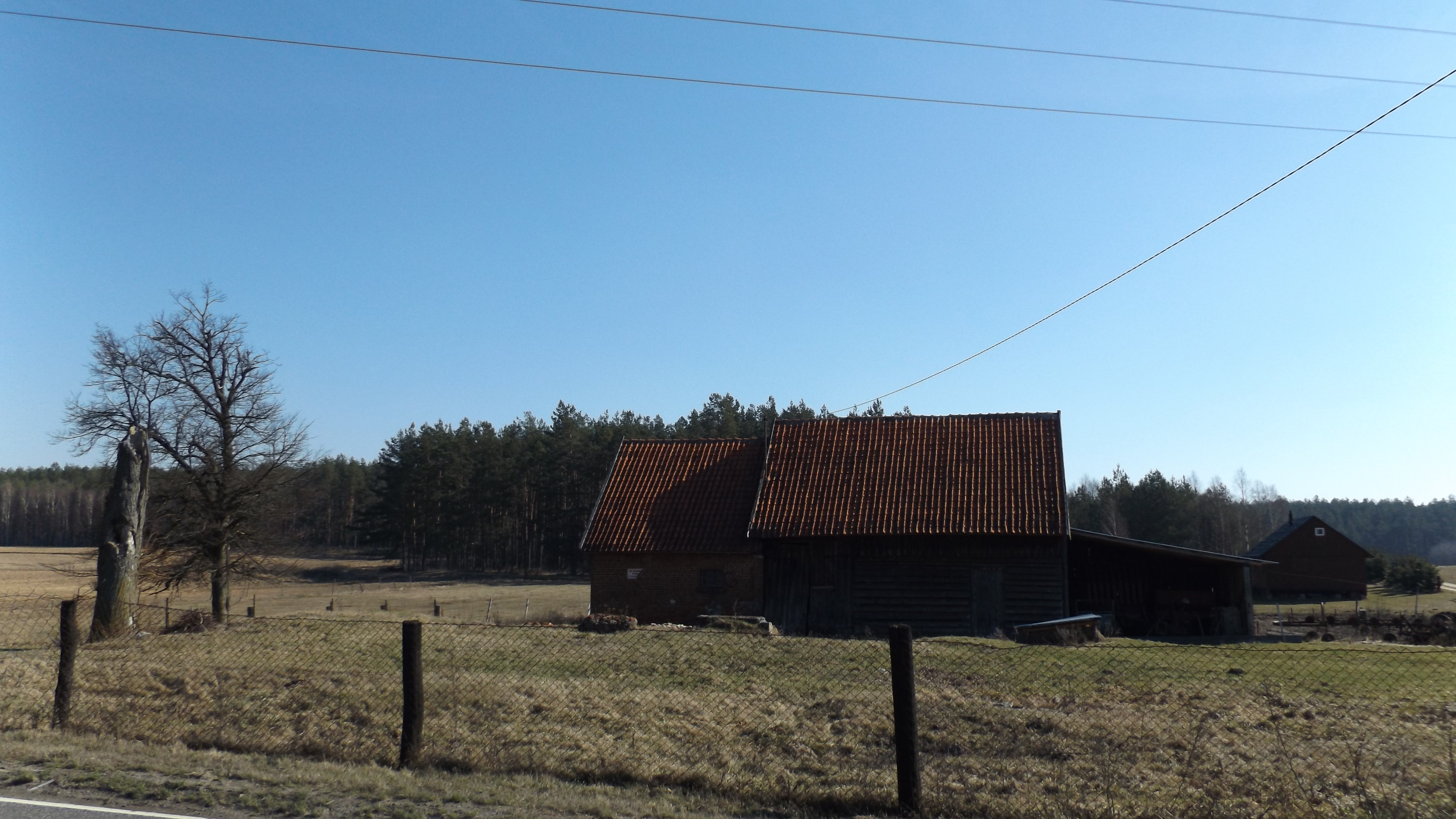

- Location within Poland
- Coordinates: 53°33′N 20°33′E
- Country: Poland
- Voivodeship: Warmian-Masurian
- County: Olsztyn
- Gmina: Olsztynek
- Time zone: UTC+1 (CET)
  - Summer (DST): UTC+2 (CEST)
- Postal code: 11-015
- Vehicle registration: NOL

Dąb [dɔmp] is a village in the administrative district of Gmina Olsztynek, within Olsztyn County, Warmian-Masurian Voivodeship, in northern Poland.
