= Dąb, Greater Poland Voivodeship =

Dąb
- Village
- Location within Poland
- Coordinates: 52°25′20″N 18°20′5″E
- Country: Poland
- Voivodeship: Greater Poland
- County: Konin
- Gmina: Skulsk

Dąb [dɔmp] is a village in the administrative district of Gmina Skulsk, within Konin County, Greater Poland Voivodeship, in west-central Poland.
