= Dąb coat of arms =

Polish coat of arms

Dąb
- Alternative names: Dub, Ehler, Żelechy
- Earliest mention: 1541
- Towns: none
- Families: 28 names altogether: Achler, Achremowicz, Adamczewski, Adamczowski, Aichler, Ajhler, Bielkiewicz, Biskupski, Dąb, Dubojski, Dzierżek, Dzierżko, Fabrycjusz, Głodowski, Gołaszewski, Kocorowski, Koczorowski, Korzeliński, Kozubowski, Rudnicki, Skirmunt, Szewiński, Szilsław, Szulc, Worcel, Worcell, Zdzisławski, Zelsławski.

Dąb (Polish for "Oak") is a Polish coat of arms of Czech origin. It was used by several szlachta (noble) families.

== Gallery ==
Dąb II

== See also ==
- Polish heraldry
- Heraldic family
- List of Polish nobility coats of arms

== Bibliography ==
- Tadeusz Gajl: Herbarz polski od średniowiecza do XX wieku : ponad 4500 herbów szlacheckich 37 tysięcy nazwisk 55 tysięcy rodów. L&L, 2007. ISBN 978-83-60597-10-1.
- Juliusz Ostrowski: Księga herbowa rodów polskich. Cz. 2. s. 54.
