= Sława =

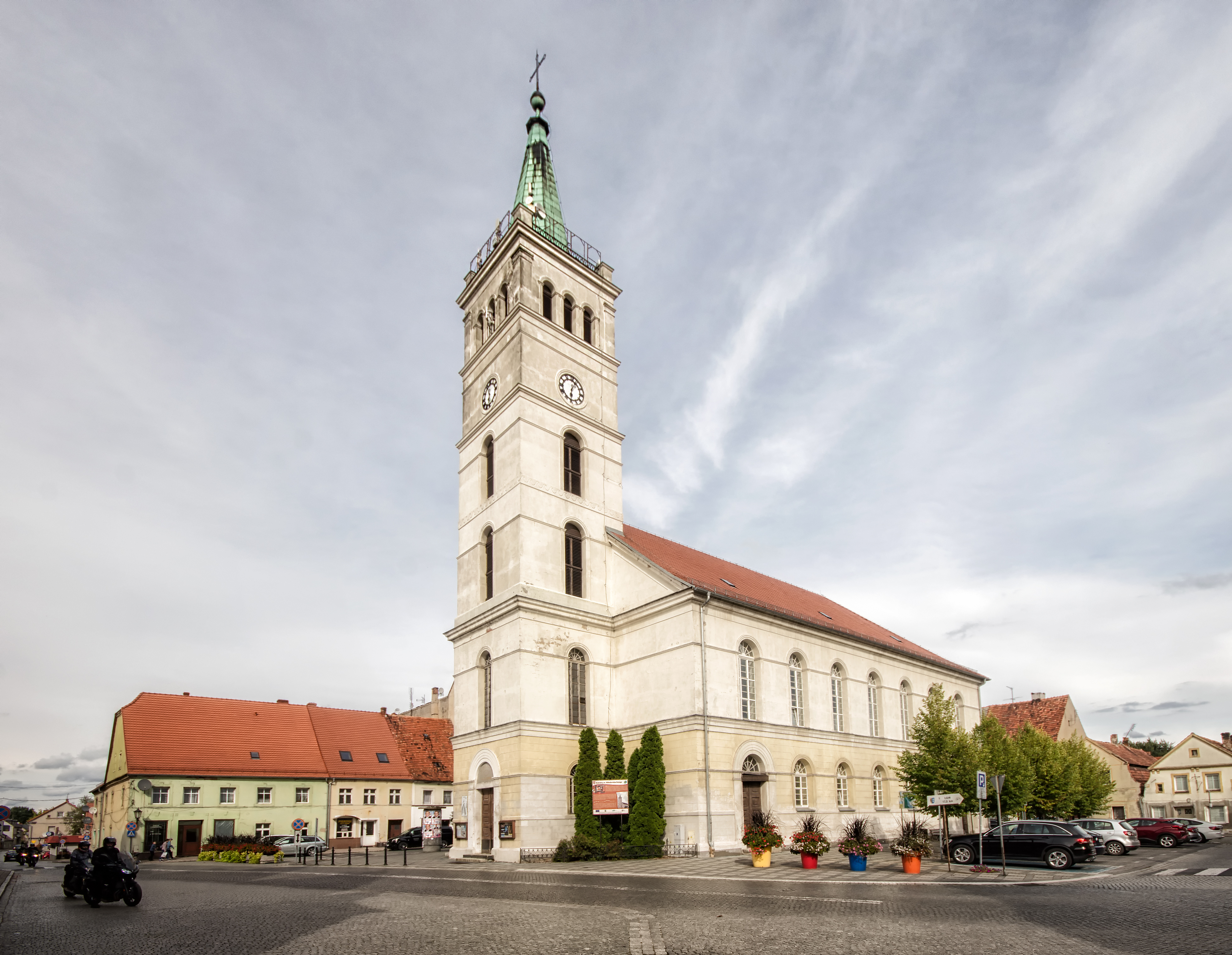
- Market Square (Rynek)

- Coat of arms

- Location within Poland
- Coordinates: 51°53′N 16°5′E
- Country: Poland
- Voivodeship: Lubusz
- County: Wschowa
- Gmina: Sława

Area
  - Total: 14.31 km^{2} (5.53 sq mi)

Population (2019-06-30)
  - Total: 4,321
  - Density: 302.0/km^{2} (782.1/sq mi)
- Time zone: UTC+1 (CET)
  - Summer (DST): UTC+2 (CEST)
- Postal code: 67-410
- Area code: +48 68
- Climate: Dfb
- Website: http://www.slawa.pl

Sława (Polish pronunciation: [ˈswava]) is a town in Wschowa County, Lubusz Voivodeship, in western Poland. As of the 2019 census, Sława had a population of 4,321.

Situated on the eastern shore of Lake Sławskie, the largest lake of the province, Sława is a popular regional holiday destination, and the location of annual regional and local regattas. Founded in medieval Poland, Sława contains a preserved medieval urban layout with a market square and several heritage sites in various styles, including Gothic, Renaissance, Baroque, Neoclassical and Art Nouveau. Sława is also known as a centre for the production of many types of traditional Polish sausages and other traditional foods and as the venue for a major annual hip-hop festival.

== Geography ==
Within the town limits lies Lake Sławskie, the largest lake of the Lubusz Voivodeship and the 39th largest lake of Poland, which contains four islands, the largest being Wyspa Ptasia ("Bird Island"). Lake Sławskie is part of a larger lake system that serves as a bird sanctuary of European importance. The lake and its environs are home to various species of birds, including mute swans, greylag gooses, common goldeneyes, common pochards, mallards, gadwalls, little grebes, red-necked grebes, great crested grebes, water rails, little crakes, common moorhens, Eurasian coots, common cranes, Eurasian bitterns, little bitterns, western marsh harriers, white-tailed eagles, common kingfishers, bearded reedlings, Savi's warblers and great reed warblers.

== Etymology ==
The name of the town is of Polish origin and means "glory" or "fame". In 1481, the town was noted as Sław.

== History ==
The area was part of Poland after the creation of the state in the 10th century. Later on, as a result of the fragmentation of Poland into smaller provincial duchies, Sława initially formed part of Greater Poland before it passed to Silesia, and then to the Duchy of Głogów, where it remained ruled by the Piast dynasty until 1468. The local Catholic parish was probably founded by the 13th century. The town was mentioned in a document from 1312. During the Reformation, the parish church passed to the Protestants in 1524, before it returned to the Catholics in 1654.

In the 18th century, the town was annexed by Prussia, and between 1871 and 1945 the town was part of unified Germany under the Germanized name Schlawa. In the 19th century, it was a centre of the weaving industry. In 1937 it was renamed Schlesiersee during the Nazi campaign of erasing placenames of Polish origin.

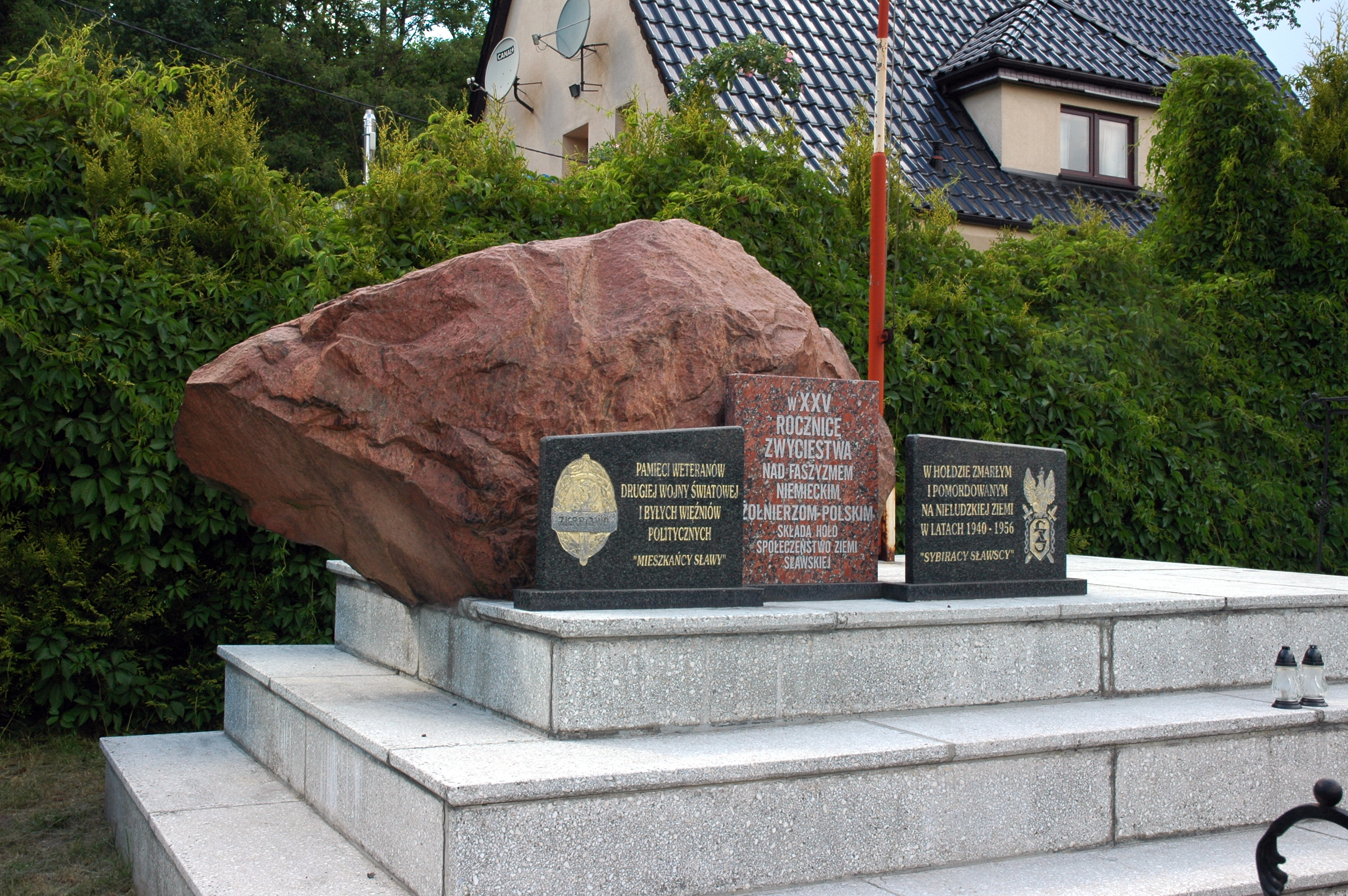
World War II memorial

During World War II, the Germans operated a women's subcamp of the Gross-Rosen concentration camp in the town. The prisoners were mostly Jewish women from German-occupied Poland and Hungary, brought from the Gross-Rosen and Auschwitz concentration camps and the Theresienstadt Ghetto. Inadequate food rations, a lack of heating and appalling sanitary conditions led to widespread infectious diseases, starvation and death amongst the prisoners; furthermore, the German guards subjected the prisoners to physical and psychological abuse. On 21 January 1945 the camp was dissolved and the surviving prisoners were sent on a death march towards Zielona Góra, and then towards Volary in German-occupied Czechoslovakia, an ordeal that not many survived. The original Polish name Sława was restored after Nazi Germany's defeat in the war, when the town once again became part of Poland.

In 1960, Sława was visited by Karol Wojtyła, future Pope John Paul II. In 1975 the Mariusz Zaruski Lubusz Sailing Club in Sława (Lubuski Klub Żeglarski im. Mariusza Zaruskiego w Sławie) was founded.

== Sights ==
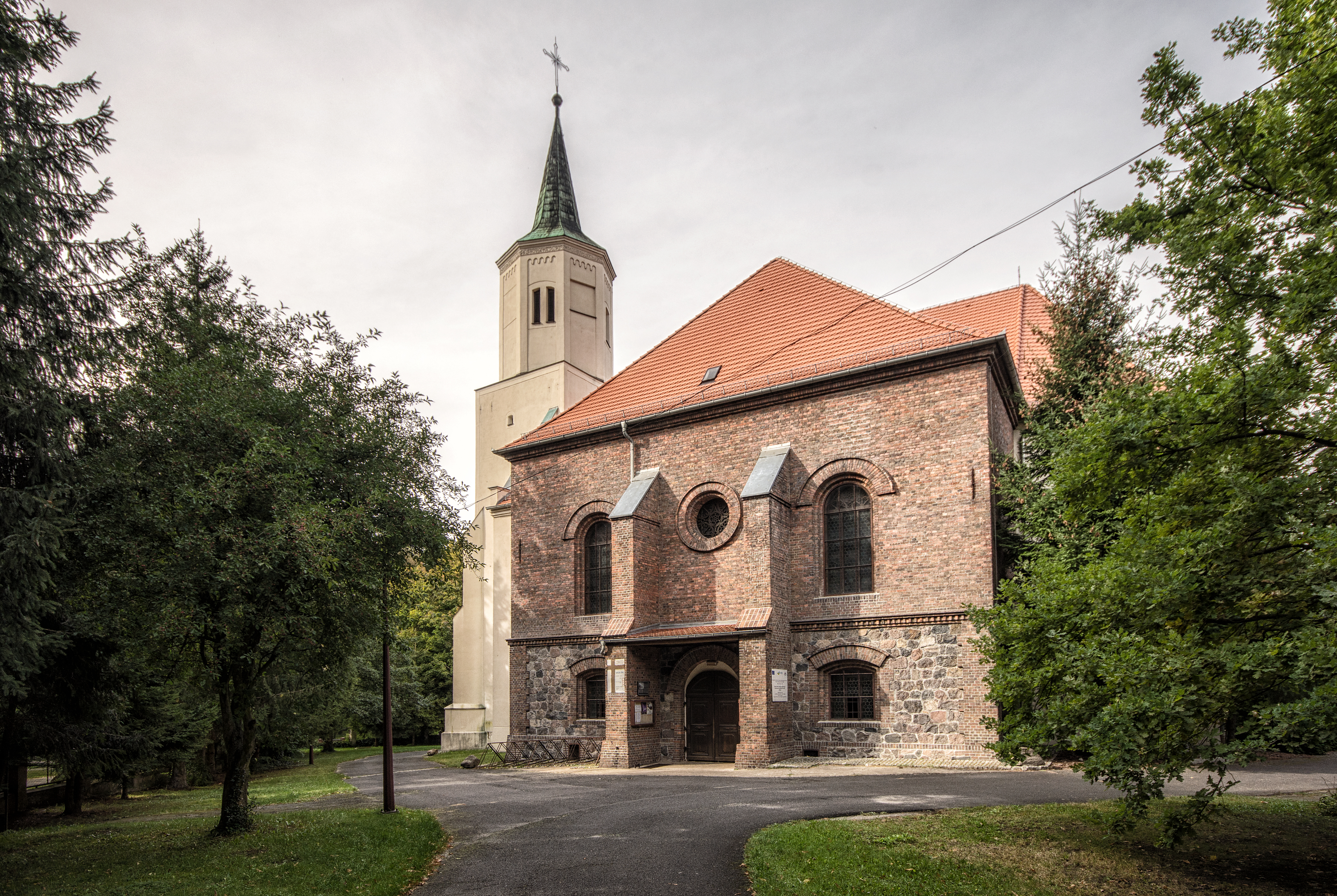
Saint Michael Archangel church

Sława contains a preserved medieval urban layout with a market square. Landmarks of Sława include the Gothic-Renaissance Church of Saint Michael Archangel, the Neoclassical Church of Divine Mercy, a Baroque palace and the Municipal Park (Park Miejski). There is a preserved observation bunker from the Second World War and a monument commemorating the victory over Nazi Germany, the victims of Soviet deportations and the veterans of the Second World War.

There are a number of attractions by the lake, including two supervised beaches with beach volleyball and beach soccer courts, an adventure park, a promenade, a marina, holiday resorts and the Ptasi Raj ("Bird Paradise") viewing platform, which allows visitors to observe the birdlife of Lake Sławskie and its islands.

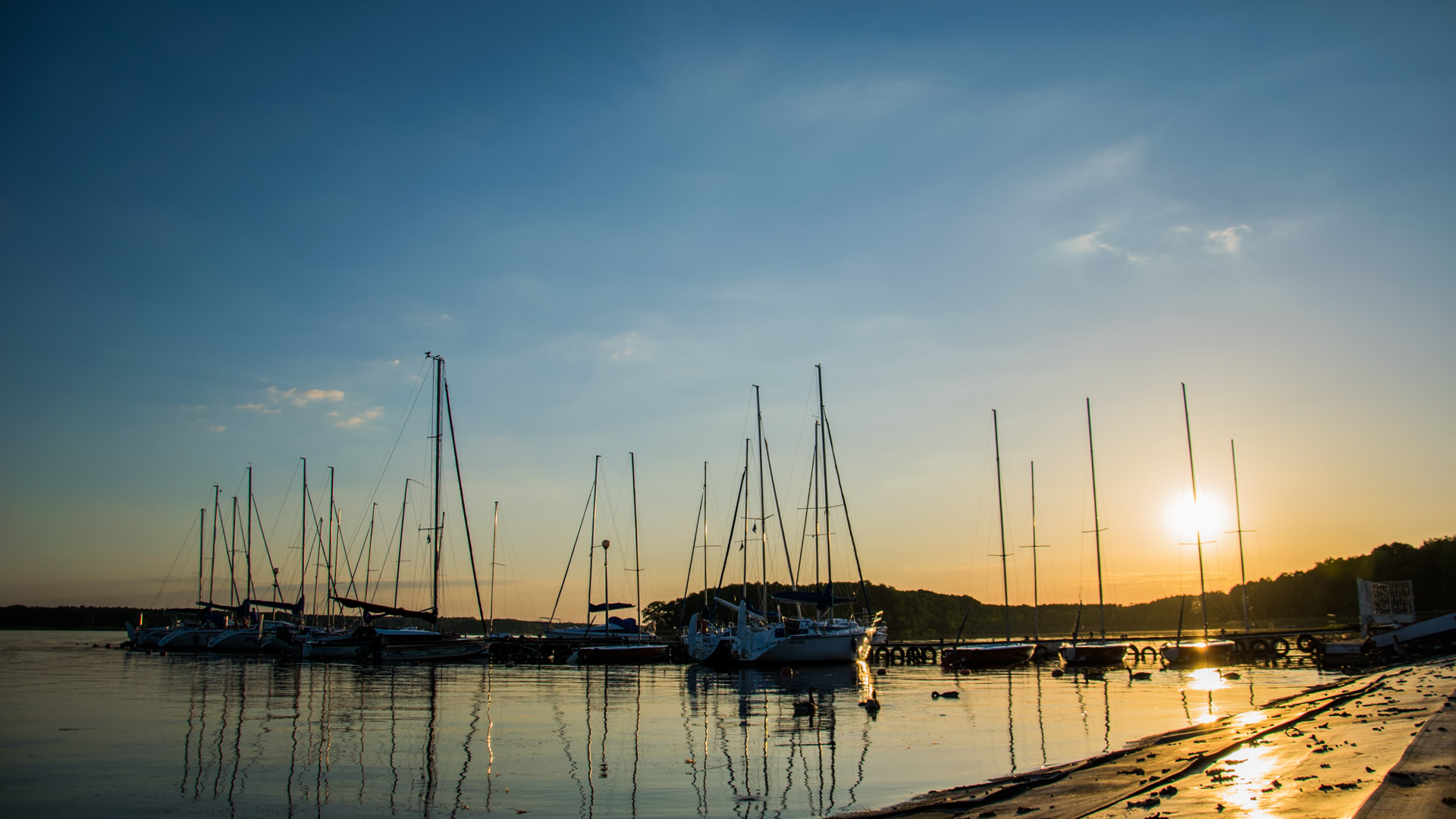
Sława Lake

== Sports ==
Annual regional and local regattas are held in Sława.

== Cuisine ==
The Sława municipality is known for poultry farming and production. The officially protected traditional foods, as designated by the Ministry of Agriculture and Rural Development of Poland, are the turkey kiełbasa myśliwska and kiełbasa sucha, and the pork and turkey kiełbasa sławska z indykiem, kiełbasa podsuszana sławska z indykiem, kiełbasa szynkowa sławska z indykiem and serdelki sławskie z indykiem, all types of kiełbasa, plus the turkey polędwica. Apart from meat products, the Sława butter (Masło sławskie) is also a designated traditional food.

== Twin towns – sister cities ==
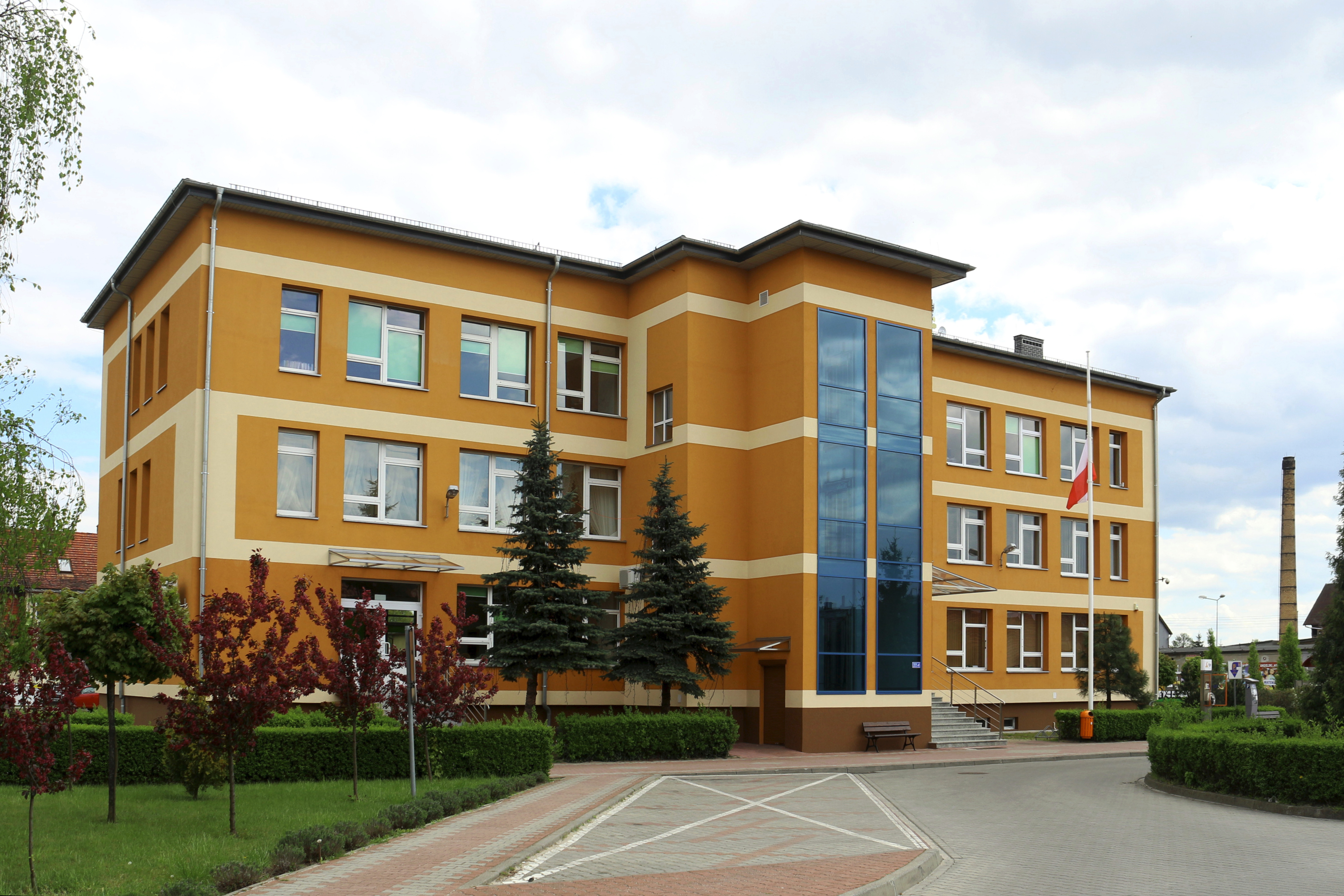
Municipal office

See twin towns of Gmina Sława.

== Transport ==
Sława lies at the intersection of voivodeship roads 318 and 278.

The nearest railway station is in Głogów.

== See also ==
- Slawa Duldig (1901–1975), Austrian-Australian inventor, artist, interior designer and teacher
