= Wschowa County =

Wschowa County Powiat wschowski
- County
- Flag Coat of arms

- Location within the voivodeship
- Coordinates (Wschowa): 51°48′N 16°18′E
- Country: Poland
- Voivodeship: Lubusz
- Seat: Wschowa
- Gminas: Total 3: Gmina Sława; Gmina Szlichtyngowa; Gmina Wschowa

Area
  - Total: 624.82 km^{2} (241.24 sq mi)

Population (2019-06-30)
  - Total: 38,960
  - Density: 62.35/km^{2} (161.5/sq mi)
  - Urban: 19,474
  - Rural: 19,486
- Car plates: FWS
- Website: http://wschowa.info/

Wschowa County (Polish: powiat wschowski) is a unit of territorial administration and local government (powiat) in Lubusz Voivodeship, western Poland. It was created in 2002 out of three gminas which previously belonged to Nowa Sól County. Its administrative seat and largest town is Wschowa, which lies 57 km (35 mi) east of Zielona Góra and 126 km (78 mi) south-east of Gorzów Wielkopolski. The county also contains the towns of Sława, lying 18 km (11 mi) north-west of Wschowa, and Szlichtyngowa, 10 km (6 mi) south of Wschowa.

The county covers an area of 624.82 square kilometres (241.2 sq mi). As of 2019 its total population is 38,960, out of which the population of Wschowa is 13,875, that of Sława is 4,321, that of Szlichtyngowa is 1,278, and the rural population is 19,486.

== Neighbouring counties ==
Wschowa County is bordered by Wolsztyn County to the north, Leszno County to the east, Góra County to the south-east, Głogów County to the south-west and Nowa Sól County to the west.

== Administrative divisions ==
The county is subdivided into three gminas (all urban-rural, centred on the three towns). These are listed in the following table (in descending order of population).

Gmina	Type	Area (km^{2})	Population (2019)	Seat
Gmina Wschowa	urban-rural	198.3	21,162	Wschowa
Gmina Sława	urban-rural	326.8	12,745	Sława
Gmina Szlichtyngowa	urban-rural	99.7	5,053	Szlichtyngowa
