= Panch Sarovar =

Locations of Panch Sarovar

According to Hindu theology, there are five sacred lakes; collectively called the Panch Sarovar or Panch-Sarovar: Manasarovar, Bindu Sarovar, Narayan Sarovar, Pampa Sarovar and Pushkar Sarovar. The lakes are mentioned in the Shrimad Bhagavata Purana. The Hindu epics, like the Ramayana and Mahabharata, also narrate the significance of bathing in these lakes. Four of the lakes are in India, while Manasarovar is in Tibet, China.

== Manasarovar ==
Lake Manasarovar and Mount Kailash are believed to be the abode of Shiva. This is where the holy river the Ganges is believed to be tamed by Shiva and sent to nourish the fertile valleys below the Himalayas. It is sometimes conflated with Meru. For the Khas, Hindu shamans of the nearby region of Humla (northwest Nepal), a ritual bath in Lake Manasarovar is an important step in gaining their shamanic powers.

== Pushkar Sarovar ==
Ramayana and Mahabharata refer to Pushkar Lake as Adi Tirtha, or the "original sacred water-body". The famous Sanskrit poet and play-writer Kalidasa also referred to this lake in his poem Abhijñānaśākuntalam. The Ramayana mentions that Vishwamitra performed penance at Pushkar Lake for a thousand years. In spite of Brahma appearing before him and granting him the higher status of a rishi instead of a royal-sage (rajarishi), Vishwamitra continued his penance, but, the celestial nymph apsara, Menaka came to the lake to take a bath. Vishwamitra was enamoured by her beauty and they decided to live together in pursuit of pleasure for ten years. Then, Vishwamitra realized that his main activity of penance was disturbed. He, therefore, took leave of Menaka and went away to the north to continue his meditation. Vishwamitra was also described as building the Brahma temple at Pushkar after Brahma's yagna.

It is also the belief of devotees that a dip in the waters of the lake on Kartik Poornima would equal the benefits that would accrue by performing yagnas (fire-sacrifices) for several centuries.
