= Pampa Sarovar =

Lake near Hampi in Karnataka, India

- ಪಂಪ ಸರೋವರ (Kannada)
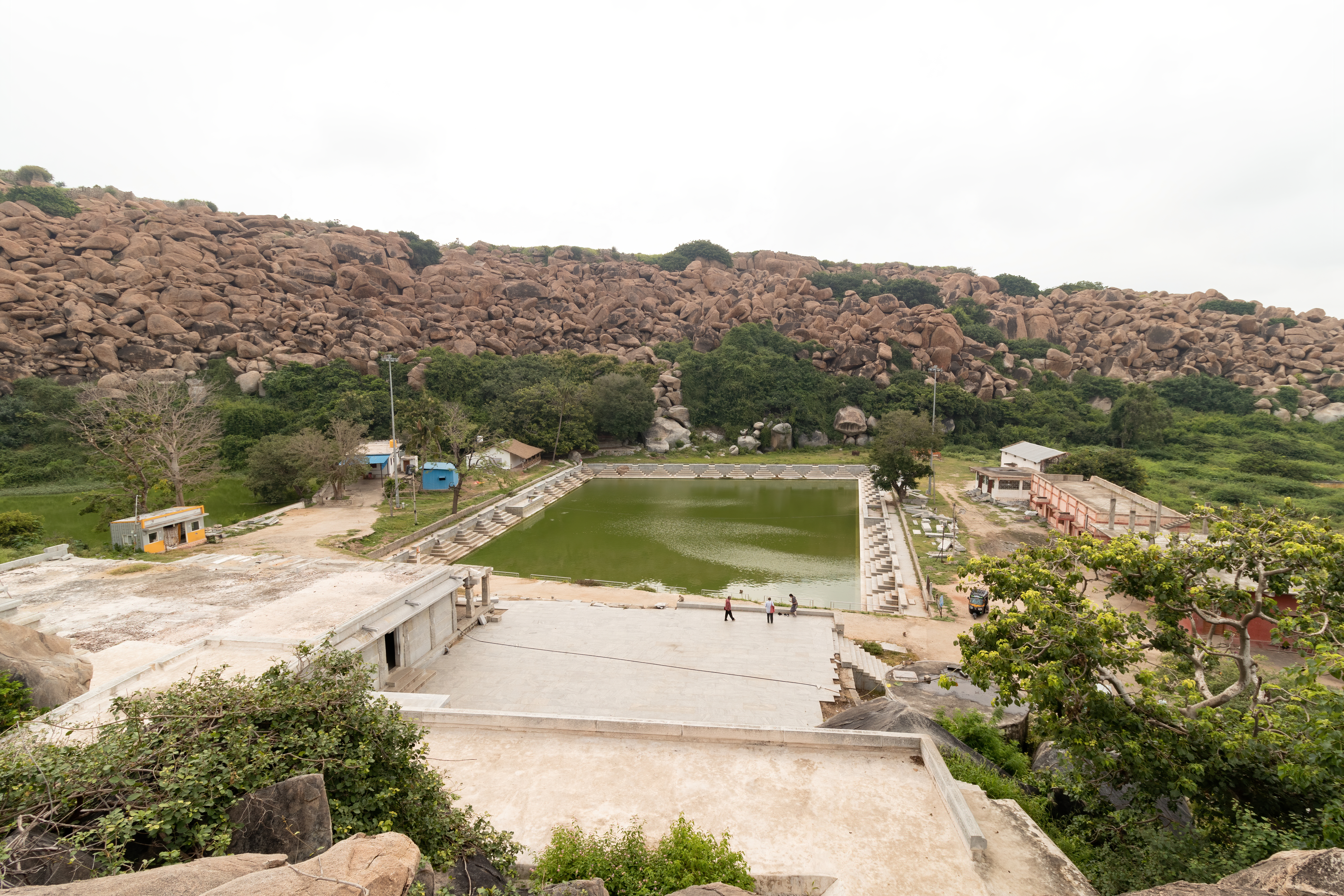

- Location within Karnataka
- Location: Hampi, Karnataka
- Coordinates: 15°21′13.55″N 76°28′38.55″E
- Basin countries: India
- Max. length: 1 kilometre (0.62 mi)

Pampa Sarovara is a lake in Koppal district near Hampi in Karnataka. It is located south of the Tungabhadra River and is considered sacred by Hindus. It is one of the five sacred sarovars, or lakes in India. According to Hindu theology, the five sacred lakes are collectively called Panch Sarovar and includes Mansarovar, Bindu Sarovar, Narayan Sarovar, Pampa Sarovar and Pushkar Sarovar. They are also mentioned in Shrimad Bhagavata Purana. In Hindu scriptures, Pampa Sarovar is regarded as the place where Pampa, a form of Shiva's consort Parvati, performed penance to show her devotion to Shiva. Pampa Sarovar is also mentioned in the Hindu epic Ramayana as the place where Rama was advised to go to by Shabari to meet Sugreev who would help him in his search of Sita.

== Description ==
The Pampa Sarovar lake is located in a valley, hidden among the hills on the road to Anegundi from Hospet. It is about a kilometer from the foothills of the Hanuman Temple. There is a Lakshmi temple, as well as a Shiva temple facing the pond. Next to the pond, under a mango tree stands a small Ganesh shrine.

== Related scriptural reference ==
In the Ramayana, Pampa Sarovar is mentioned as the place where Shabari (also Shabri), a disciple of the Rishi Matanga, directed Rama as he journeyed southwards on his quest to redeem Sita, his wife, from the demon King Ravana. According to the story, Shabari, a pious devotee of Rama, prayed faithfully everyday to see Rama. She lived in the ashram of her Guru Matanga in the place now known as Matanga Parvat in Hampi. Before her Guru Matanga Rishi died he told her she would certainly see Rama. After his death, Shabari continued to live in the ashram awaiting Rama. 13 years passed by and Shabari became an old woman and finally Rama came to the place and stopped at the ashram on his journey to Lanka. She proceeded to feed Rama and his brother Lakshmana. Touched by her piety Rama and Lakshmana bowed down at her feet. Then, they narrated to her the incident of Sita's kidnapping and Shabari suggested that they seek help from Hanuman and Sugriva of the monkey kingdom who lived further south near the Pampa lake. Rama took sacred bath in Matanga Lake.

== See also ==
- Hampi
- Ramayana
