= Koteshwar, Kutch =

Koteshwar
- Village
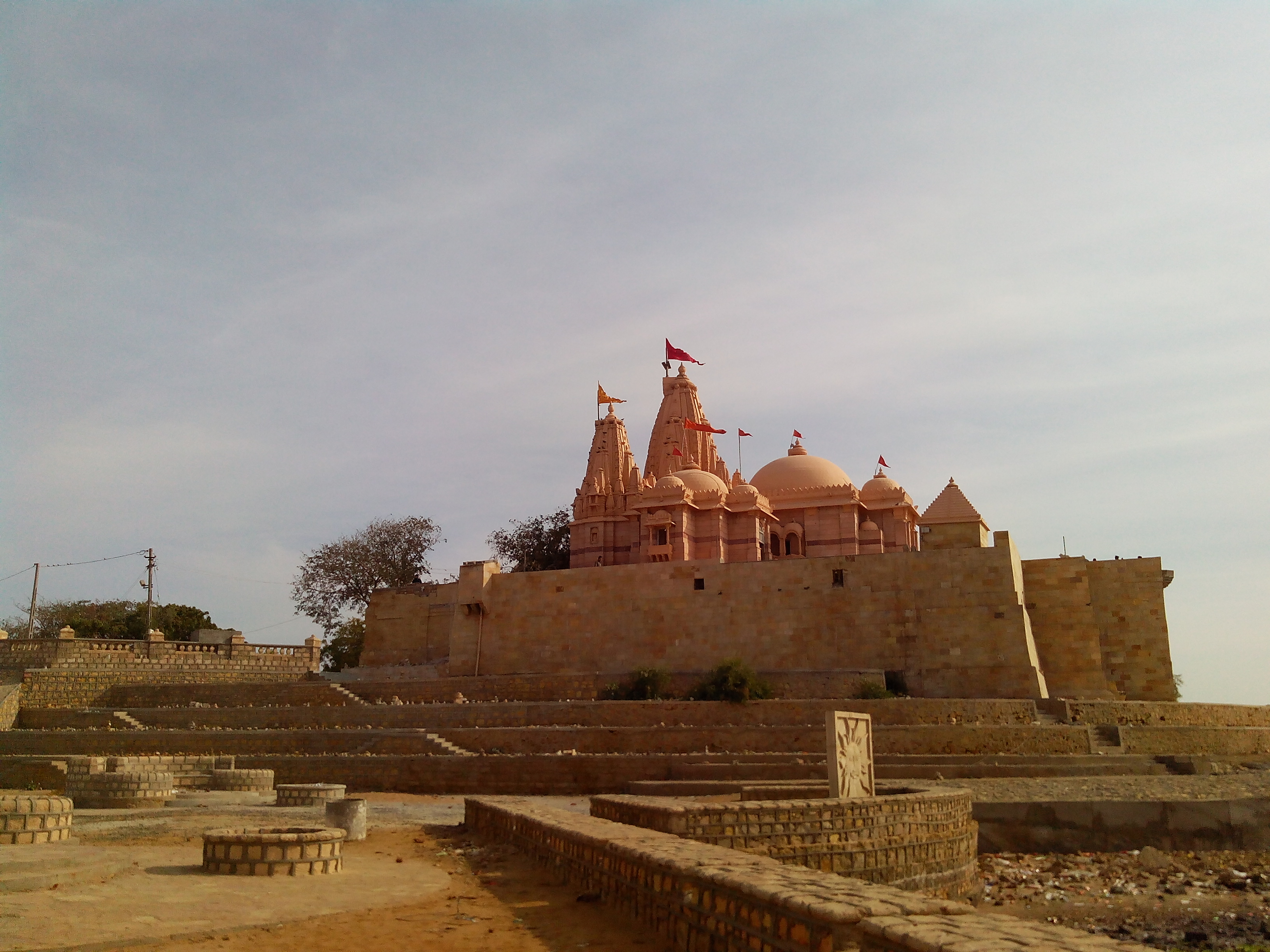
- Koteshwar Temple

- Location in Gujarat, India Koteshwar (India)
- Coordinates: 23°42′N 68°32′E
- Country: India
- State: Gujarat

Languages
  - Official: Gujarati, Hindi
- Time zone: UTC+5:30 (IST)
- Website: gujaratindia.com

Koteshwar is a small village and the location of an ancient Shiva temple. It located near the mouth of Kori Creek, in the west of Kutch district of Gujarat, India.

In past, the temple was almost entirely cut off from the mainland by tidal creeks but now is connected by road. Koteshwar Mahadev is said to be the Bhairava of Hinglaj Mata residing at Hinglaj. The virtuous devotees are therefore recommended to visit Koteshwar after they have visited Hinglaj Mata.

== Etymology ==
Koteshwar literally means "ten million gods".

== History ==
The earliest mention of the place can be found in writings of Chinese traveler Hiuen-Tsiang. Hiuen-Tsiang mentioned it as "Kie-tsi-shi-fa-lo situated on the western border of the country close to the river Indus and to the great ocean" of Kutch. According to Hieu-en-Tsiang, Koteshwar port was five miles in boundary near the mouth of the river Indus. There were 80 monasteries with about 5000 monks in them chiefly from the school of Sammityas. In the middle of the completion were thirteen temples of which Mahesh Mandir was full of good monument and where ash-smeared heretics lived.

Except some temples, Koteshwar shows few signs of its former greatness.

=== Legend ===
The story of Koteshwar begins with Ravana, who won it as a boon from Lord Shiva for an outstanding display of piety, this Shiva linga of great spiritual power. But which Ravana, in his arrogant haste, accidentally dropped and it fell to earth at Koteshwar. To punish Ravana for his carelessness, the linga turned into a thousand identical ones, some versions of the story say ten thousand, some a million. Unable to distinguish the original, Ravana grabbed one and departed, leaving the original one here, around which Koteshwar Temple was built. The temple is also known as Kotilingeshwar Temple.

== Places of interest ==
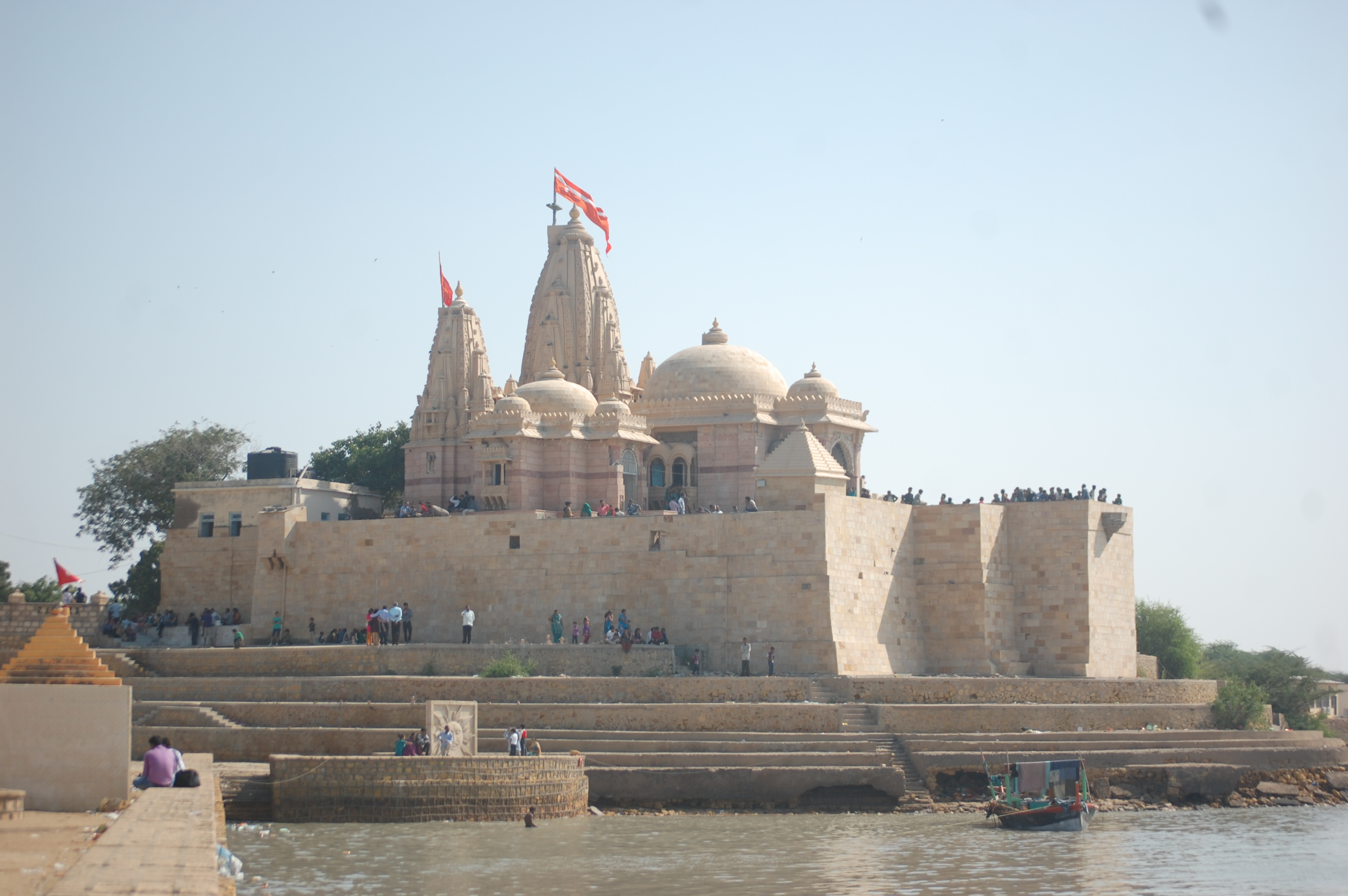
Koteshwar Mahadev Temple

=== Koteshwar Mahadev Temple ===
The temples, on a sandstone mound about a mile to the north-west of the village, rising boldly from the sea that washes their western face, are enclosed by a fortified wall, the gate approached by three flights of steps. A writing on the left side of the gate shows that the present fort and temples were built in 1820 (Samvat 1877) by two Seths, Sundarji and Jetha Shivji, Brahma-Kshatris by caste. The courtyard is surrounded by a battlemented wall armed formerly with three small guns. In the middle, on a platform 4 1/2 feet high 63 1/2 long and 49 broad, is a handsomely built stone temple of Mahadev. The porch has three domes with, under the central dome, a large and beautiful brass bull presented by Rao Deshalji I of Cutch State; in the right dome a large statue of Hanuman and in tho left dome one of Ganpati. Inside the porch is the hall, mandap, 19 feet 9 inches long and 24 feet 8 inches wide, with a large central and two side domes. On a marble tablet, let into the centre of the hall floor, the names of Kshatri Jetha and Sundarji Shivji are humbly cut that the feet of the worshippers may tread on them. At the inner end of the hall and between it and the shrine are, on either side, figures of Ganpati and Hanuman. In the screen wall of the shrine are two inscriptions referring to the rebuilding of the temple in 1820. The frame of the door is of carved stone. The door itself, 2 1/2 feet wide and 12 3/4 high, is plated with carved silver. The shrine, paved with black marble, is 11 1/2 feet square. In the back wall is an image of Parvati, and in tho west wall are two images of Ganpati and Revaji. In the centre of a basin, jaladhari, rather far back in the shrine, is a four feet high ling of the kind called self-born, svayambhu. In the point of the ling are some iron nails driven into it, according to the local story, by Alauddin Khalji in 13th century.

On the site of this modern temple there stood an older building, one of whose stones is said to have borne an inscription to the effect that it was built by the Kers of Golay. This stone has disappeared, but among the Kers, who are now a Muslim clan, the story that their forefathers built the temple still remains. At the time of rebuilding the temple in 1820, the foundation of the east wall was kept and it was enlarged on the west. The change so altered the position of the ling that it was no longer under the central lotus. This was said to be ominous to the ruler, and in 1863 (Samvat 1920) Rao Pragmalji I of Cutch State, when he visited the temple, ordered a silver canopy to be placed over the ling. By the Rao's death the work was stayed before the plans were finished. In ancient times the temple priest was a devotee of the ear-slitting or Kanphati sect. But for sixteen successions the office has been in the hands of Shaiv Atits. In the past, the yearly revenue from lands granted by the Rao and others, one of whom is said to have been a Muslim, is about £791 (30,000 Kutch koris).

The temples have been rehabilitated and renovated over many centuries by various rulers of Kutch, renovation done by local Kutchi artisans. From this point, the glow of light from Karachi, Pakistan can be seen in a clear night. It is a sunset point.

=== Other temples ===
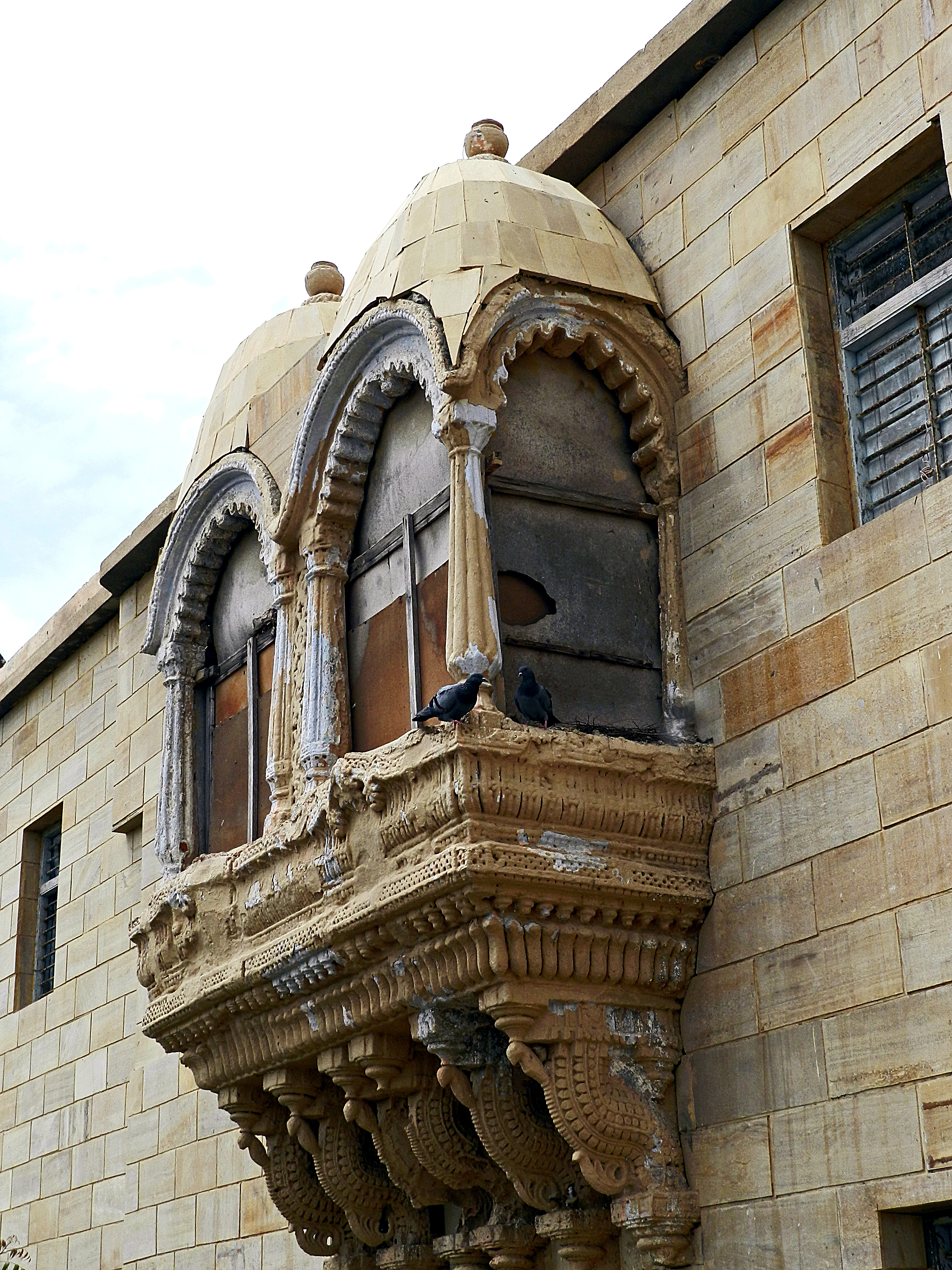
This ancient balcony is in the 'Koteshwar Temple' complex

The holy man used to live at Dhunay, three miles east of Koteshwar. He is said to have moved to the present spot in the fifteenth century, when the Brahmachari of Narayan Sarovar established his power. Close to the chief Koteshvar Mahadev temple, is a smaller temple, built by the same men and about the same time in honour of Kalyaneshvar.

From the fort a paved causeway, twelve feet broad and used as a pier by country craft, runs out for 520 feet. At the end is a square reservoir filled by every high tide, where Hindus perform the shraddh ceremony and bathe. On the middle of the pier is a square platform, kotha, on which is built the temple of Nilkanth, now known as Saraneshvar, facing the west with a porch and a small Islamic dome. It is said to have been originally built in the thirteenth century by God Rani who had come to marry Ra Kanoj, but some difference arising, she went to Sindh and married Lakha Ghurara. It was rebuilt by Mahakunvar, wife of Desalji I (1718 - 1741), and repaired by Kshatri Jetha and Sundarji Shivji. It was again, in 1857, repaired by Gosai Dolatgarji Revagar Kunvargar at a cost of about £200 (7800 koris).

=== Rao Kanoj shrine ===
Across the Kori from Koteshwar, about nine miles to the north-west, is the samadhi (shrine/tomb) of Rao Kanoj built in 1773 (Samvat 1830), twenty feet long by sixteen broad and twenty -eight high, with one large central and four corner domes, Ra Kanoj is said to be the son of the daughter of Ra Bhalot, chief of Ujjain, who, about the end of the ninth century, in a fight with a Muslim army, was killed at Sekot a small fort half a mile north-east of Narayan Sarovar. The priests of the shrine used to be sailors of the Bhadala caste, now they are Jats.

== Connectivity ==
It is 178 km from Bhuj, district headquarters of Kutch and only 4 km towards the north-west of Narayan Sarovar, another ancient Hindu pilgrimage site.

== Gallery ==
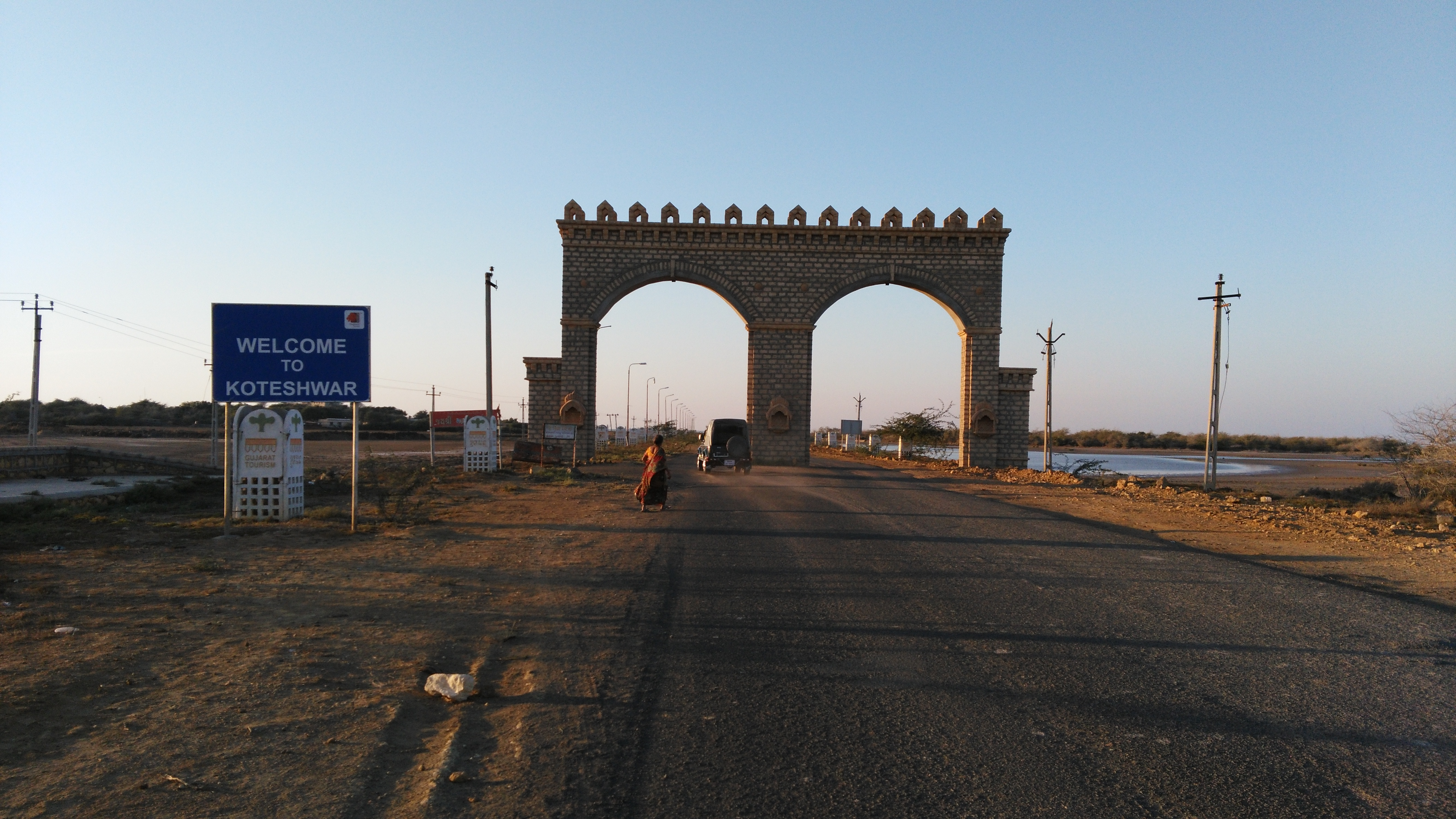
Gateway of Koteshwar

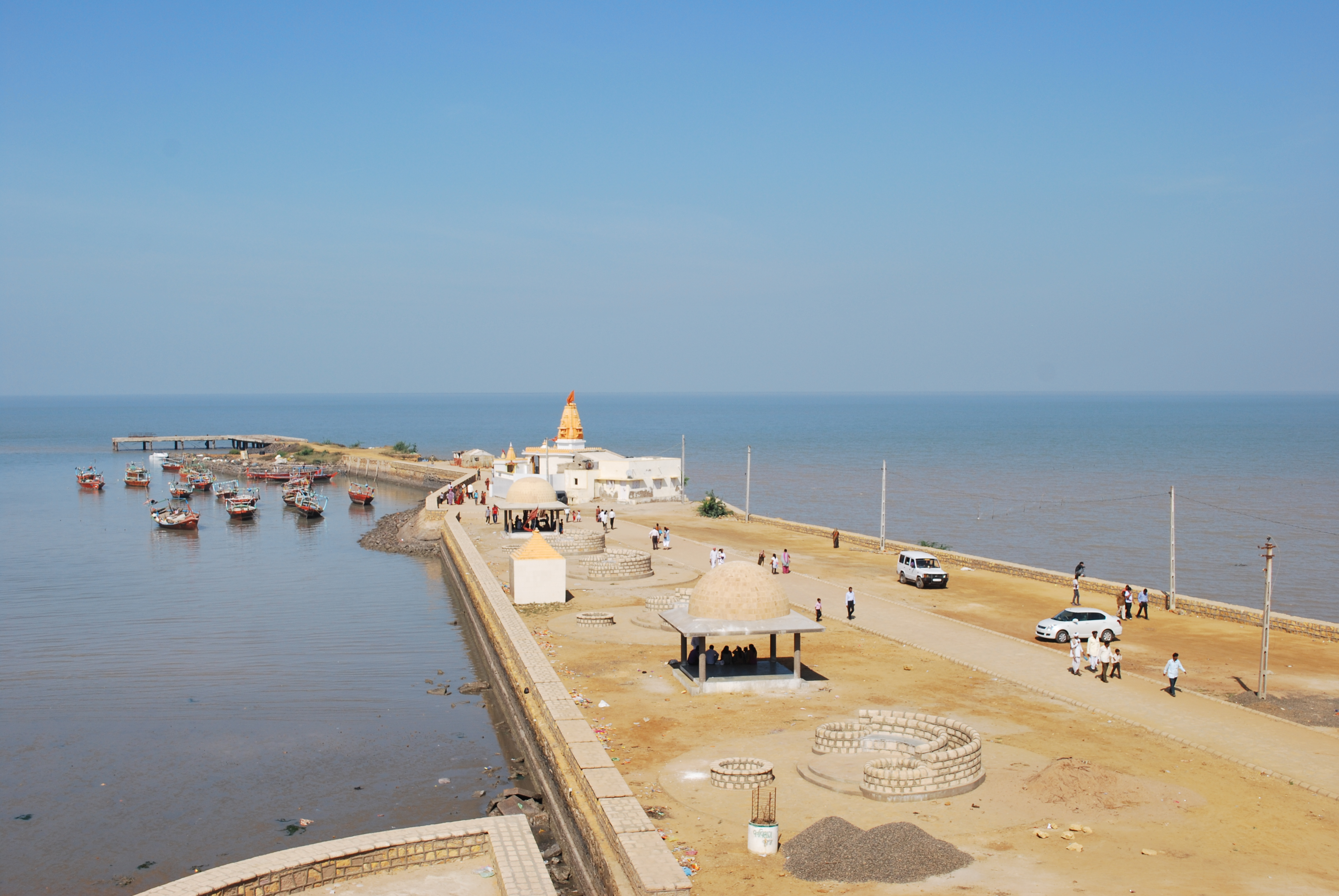
Seaside view from Temple

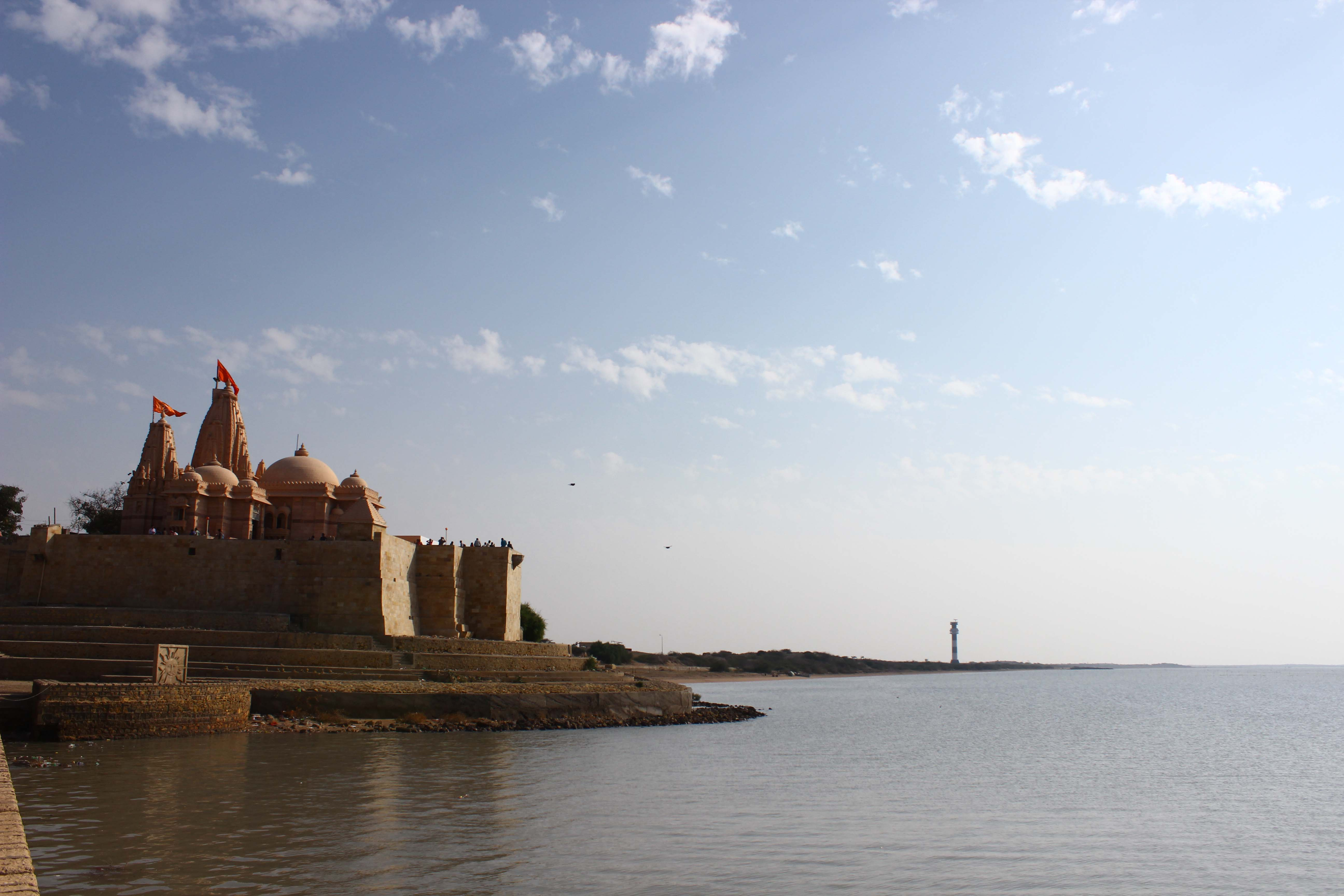
Evening View

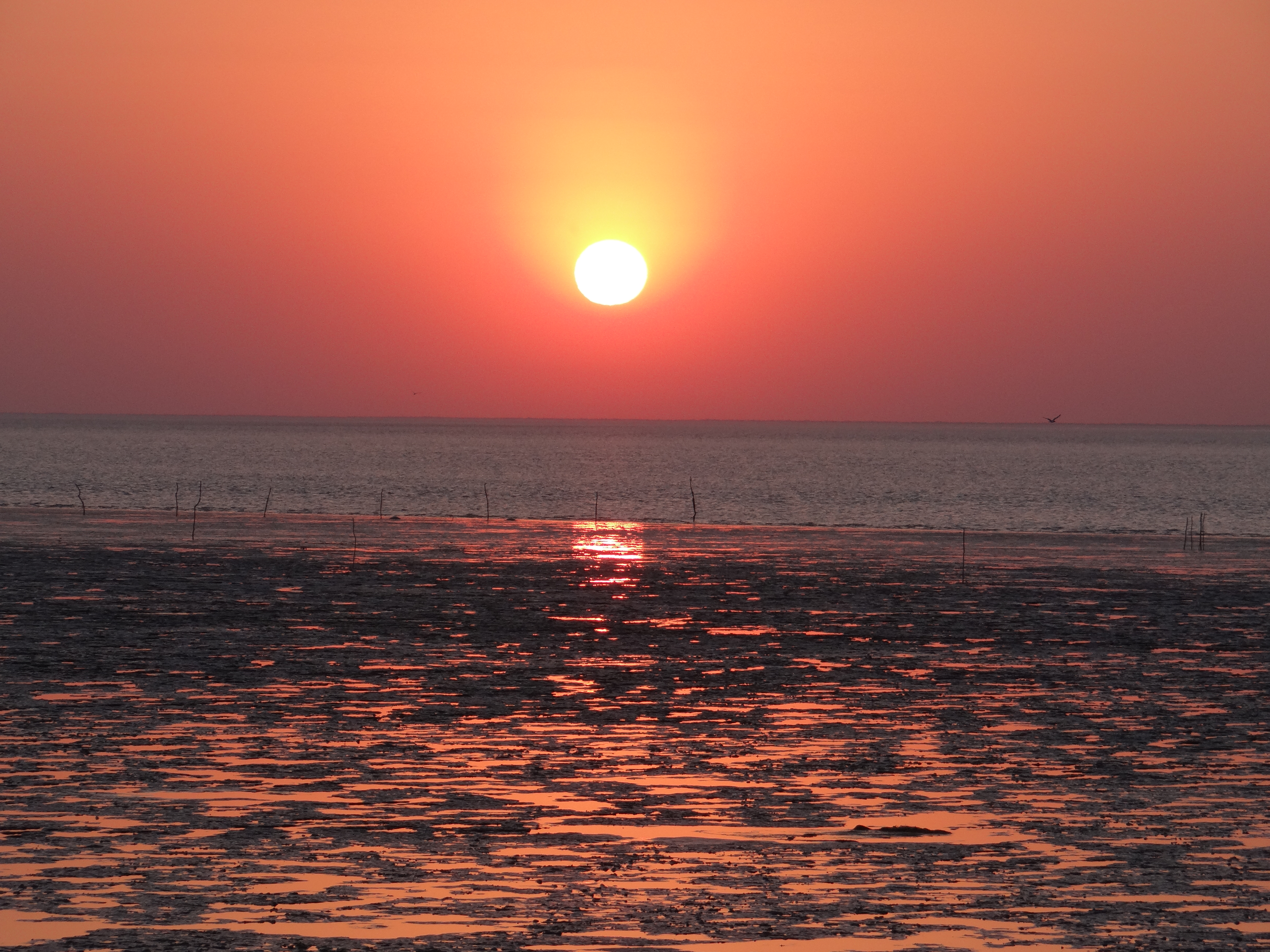
The sun sets at Koteshwar, a temple town near the border at Kutch, Gujarat.
