= Narayan Sarovar =

- Village
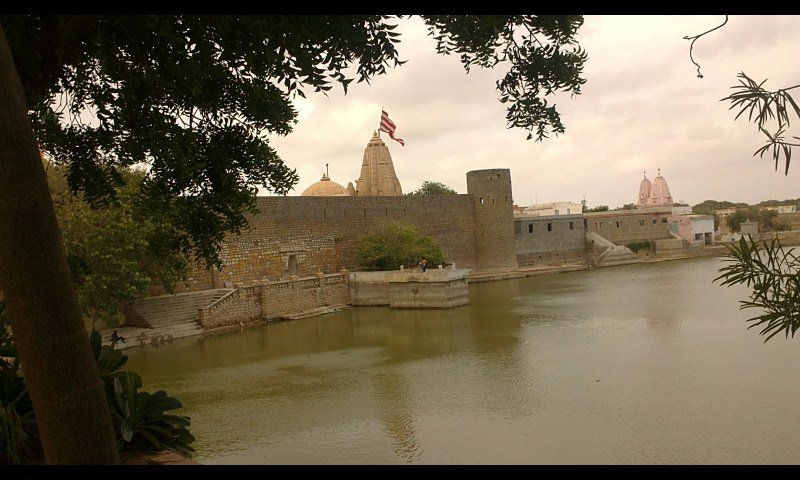
- Narayan Sarovar

- Location in Gujarat, India Narayan Sarovar (India)
- Coordinates: 23.675°N 68.538°E
- Country: India
- State: Gujarat
- District: Kutch district

Area
  - Total: 0.759 km^{2} (0.293 sq mi)
- Elevation: 8.285 m (27.18 ft)

Languages
  - Official: Gujarati, Hindi
- Time zone: UTC+5:30 (IST)
- PIN: 370627
- Telephone code: 2832
- Vehicle registration: GJ-12
- Website: gujaratindia.com

Narayan Sarovar or Narayansar is a village and place of pilgrimage for Hindus on the Kori Creek. It is located in the Lakhpat taluka of Kutch district in the Indian state of Gujarat. The ancient Koteshwar temple lies 4 km away to the northwest. The temple is classified among the 108 Abhimana Kshethram of Vaishnavate tradition.

== Temples ==
The temples, the chief buildings in the place, are surrounded by a fortified wall, outside of which cluster the villagers' houses. It was formerly connected with the mainland by a yellow stone causeway, about 3000 feet long and fifteen wide, built in 1863 by a Bhatia of Bombay, named Gokaldas Liladhar Padsha, at a cost of about £2500 (1,00,000 Kutch koris). A new causeway has since been built.

It was in very ancient times famous for its great lake. This, agreeing with the account of the lake found by Alexander, and perhaps lasting till the change of the course of the Indus river (about 1000), was in part renewed by the earthquake of 1819. Beside the lake, there had been a temple dedicated to Adinarayan in the village since ancient times. For long under priests of the Kanphata sect, the temple was, about 1550 (Samvat 1607), wrested from them by a Sanyasi or Atit named Narangar from Junagadh. Narangar made long and broad embankments about the pool, an oblong sheet of water, 1056 feet by 990, divided by perforated stone walls into a number of bathing places, and furnished on all sides except the east with flights of stone steps, and surrounded by rest-houses.

There are seven stone temples in a paved courtyard measuring 164 feet by 62 1/2feet. The temples are approached from the lake by flights of stone steps and surrounded by a strong wall. Vagheli Mahakunvar; the wife of Rao Deshalji I, Rao of Cutch State; displeased with the priests of Dwarka, after taking counsel with her Brahmans, determined to raise Narayansar to be a place of rival sanctity.

Accordingly, in 1734, she first built the temples of Lakshminarayan and Trikamray in the same style as the Dwarka temples, assigning them the revenues of certain villages and the proceeds of certain taxes, and then those of Adinarayan, Govardhannath, Dwarkanath, and Lakshmiji.

The temple of Trikamray, in style and shape resembling that at Koteshwar, 72 feet long 68 1/2 broad and 61 high, stands on a 5 feet 9 inches high platform, and has three side porches with a large one in the centre, all capped with domes resting on twelve feet high pillars. The central porch is 21 feet square, and each of the side porches 9 feet 9 inches. The 1819 earthquake threw down the central dome, but it has since been rebuilt. The space between the central dome and the shrine is paved with white and black marble. In the east screen wall of the shrine is a marble plate with an inscription. The doors are plated with silver. In the shrine, on a silver throne, stands a black marble image of Trikamray. Under the idol throne is a black marble figure of Vishnu's eagle, Garuda, with clasped hands kneeling on one leg. Over the image of Trikamray are forty gold and silver parasols, the offerings of devotees.

The other five temples built by Vagheli Mahakunvar form, along with the more lately built temple of Kalyanray, a row of six domes supported by fourteen pillars, and forty-eight pilasters, with carving on the bases, shafts, and capitals. The brackets are scrolled volutes and the side pillars of one dome serve to support the lintel of the next, and the corresponding pillars of the next act similarly for the third dome. The temples at the two ends have screen walls under their domes with doors, but the rest have a common verandah with entrances in the fronts the space on the two sides of each entrance being closed with a screen of wooden lattice. Each of the temples has an inscription. Lakshmiji's temple is without any special feature. Dwarkanath's or Ranchhodji's temple has a small shrine opposite to it with a large image of Garuda, holding a weapon whose point impales a cobra. The third shrine, to Govardhannath, is simple. The fourth, to Adinarayan, has a black stone pavement in the gallery. Opposite it is a small lately built shrine of Gopalji. The last, to Lakshminarayan, has silver-plated doors and an idol throne and canopy of silver. In a line with these five temples is the temple of Kalyanray built in 1828 (Samvat 1885) by Rao Deshalji II. The stone and wood frames of the entrance are richly carved, and the doors are plated with silver in which flowers, fruit, leaves, and creepers are carved with much skill. The canopy of the god stands on a pedestal, and is supported on four silver pillars with fine spiral flutes and richly carved friezes, bases, and shafts. The statue is of polished black marble.

Besides these built temples, the soft sandstone near the fort has at various times been hollowed into shrines and caves. They are known as the Ramgupha, Lakshmangupha, and Sheshgupha caves. From the brittleness of the rock they are of no great size.

== Religious significance ==
According to Hindu theology, there are five sacred lakes; collectively called Panch-Sarovar; Mansarovar, Bindu Sarovar, Narayan Sarovar, Pampa Sarovar and Pushkar Sarovar. As per legends, one of the holy rivers of India, Sarasvati River had an out let in to sea near present-day Narayan Sarovar and waters of lake were filled with holy waters of River Saraswati, that is why this place was and is still considered as one of the five holy lakes by Hindus.

Vallabhacharya visited the place during his lifetime as such the site is sacred also for the follower of Pushtimarg.

== Fairs ==
Two yearly fairs are held here, one in Chaitra (April -May) and the other from the 10th to the 15th of Kartik (November- December), when, from western India, thousands of pilgrims come to perform funeral ceremonies on the bank of the Narayan Sarovar.

Accommodation facilities are available for pilgrims.

In 1981, the area around the village is notified as a wildlife sanctuary, Narayan Sarovar Sanctuary. The red antelopes or chinkaras are found in the sanctuary.

== How to reach ==
The nearest airport to Narayan Sarovar is at Bhuj, 150 km away by road. Bhuj is also the nearest railway station for long distance trains. Naliya on the recently commissioned Bhuj-Naliya railway line is 60 km away by road.

National highway NH 41 connects Narayan Sarovar to Gandhidham via Naliya. State highway SH 49 connects Naliya to Bhuj. National highway NH 754K connects Narayan Sarovar to Bhuj and Lakhpat. Bus service between Bhuj, Naliya and Narayan Sarovar is good.

== Gallery ==
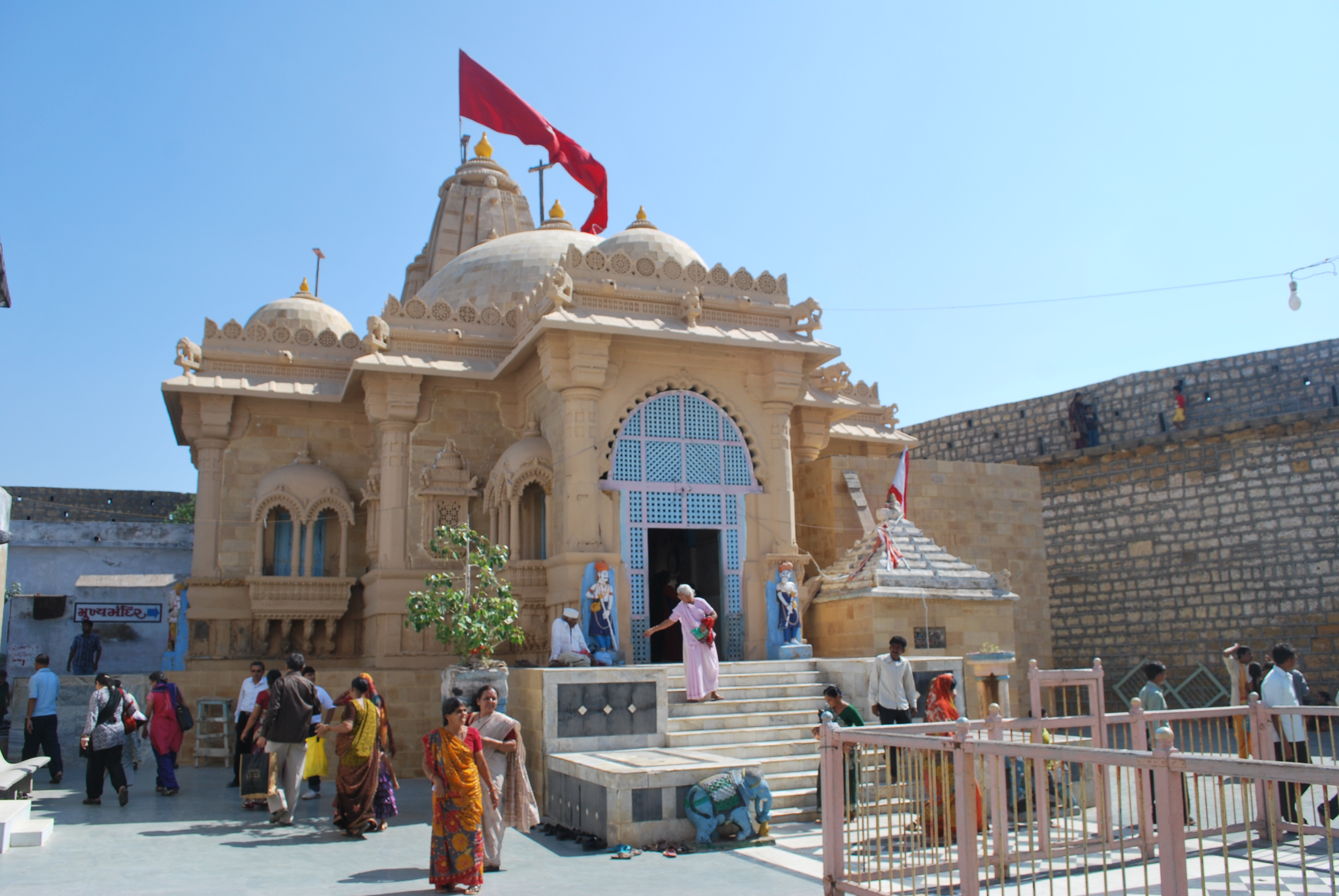
Main Temple at Narayan Sarover

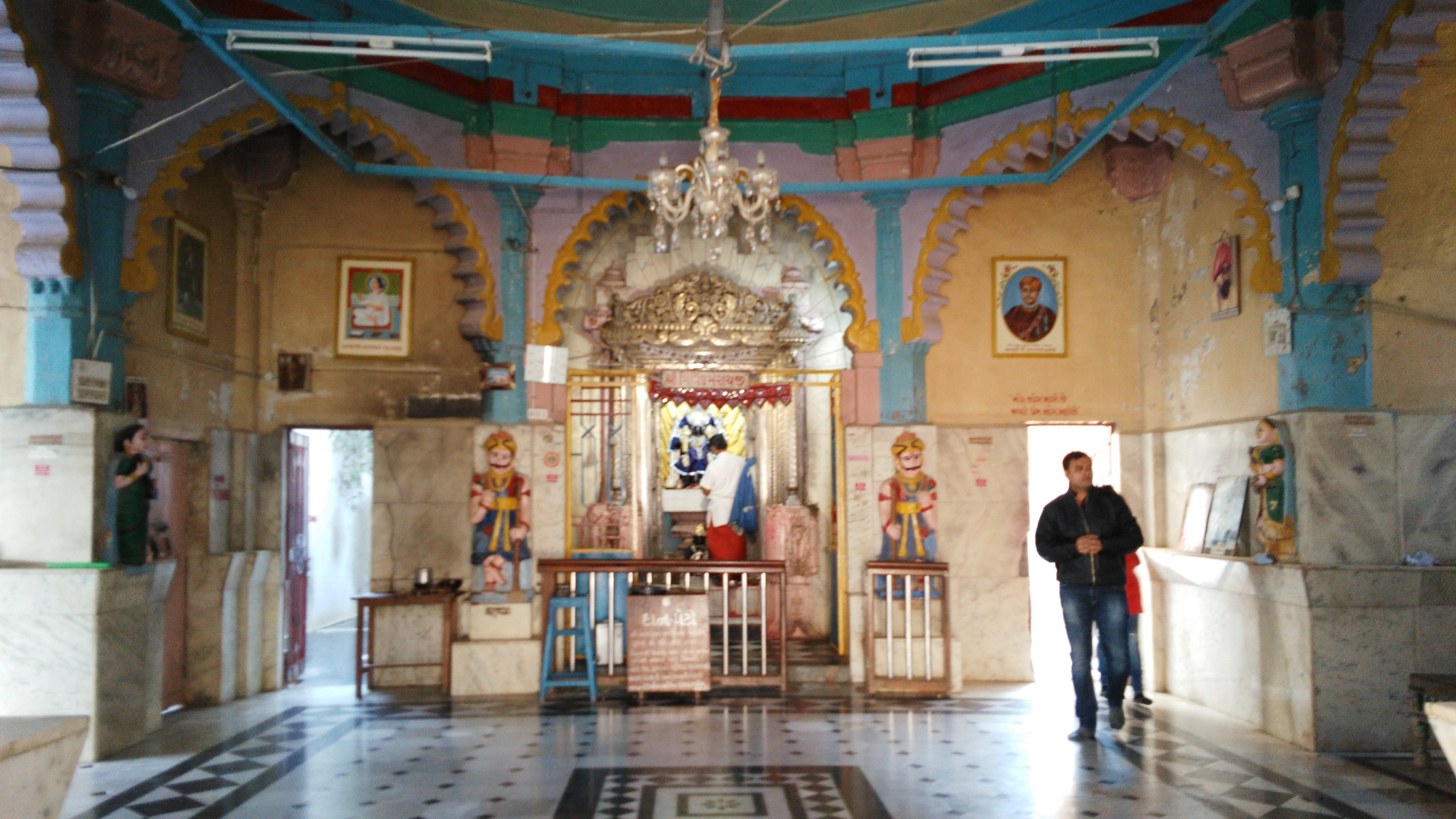
Inside view of Main Temple at Narayan Sarovar

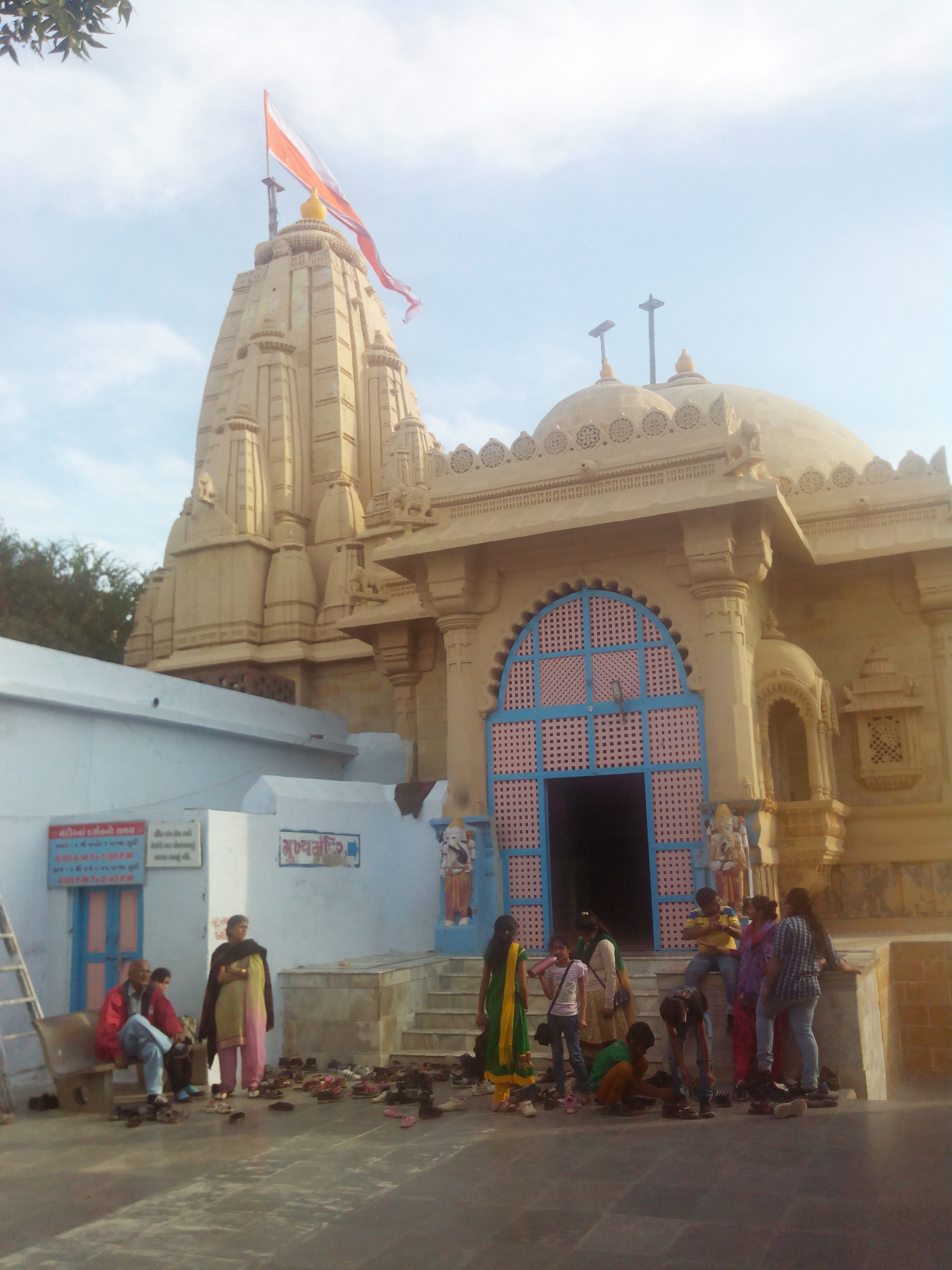
Vishnu temple at Narayan Sarovar

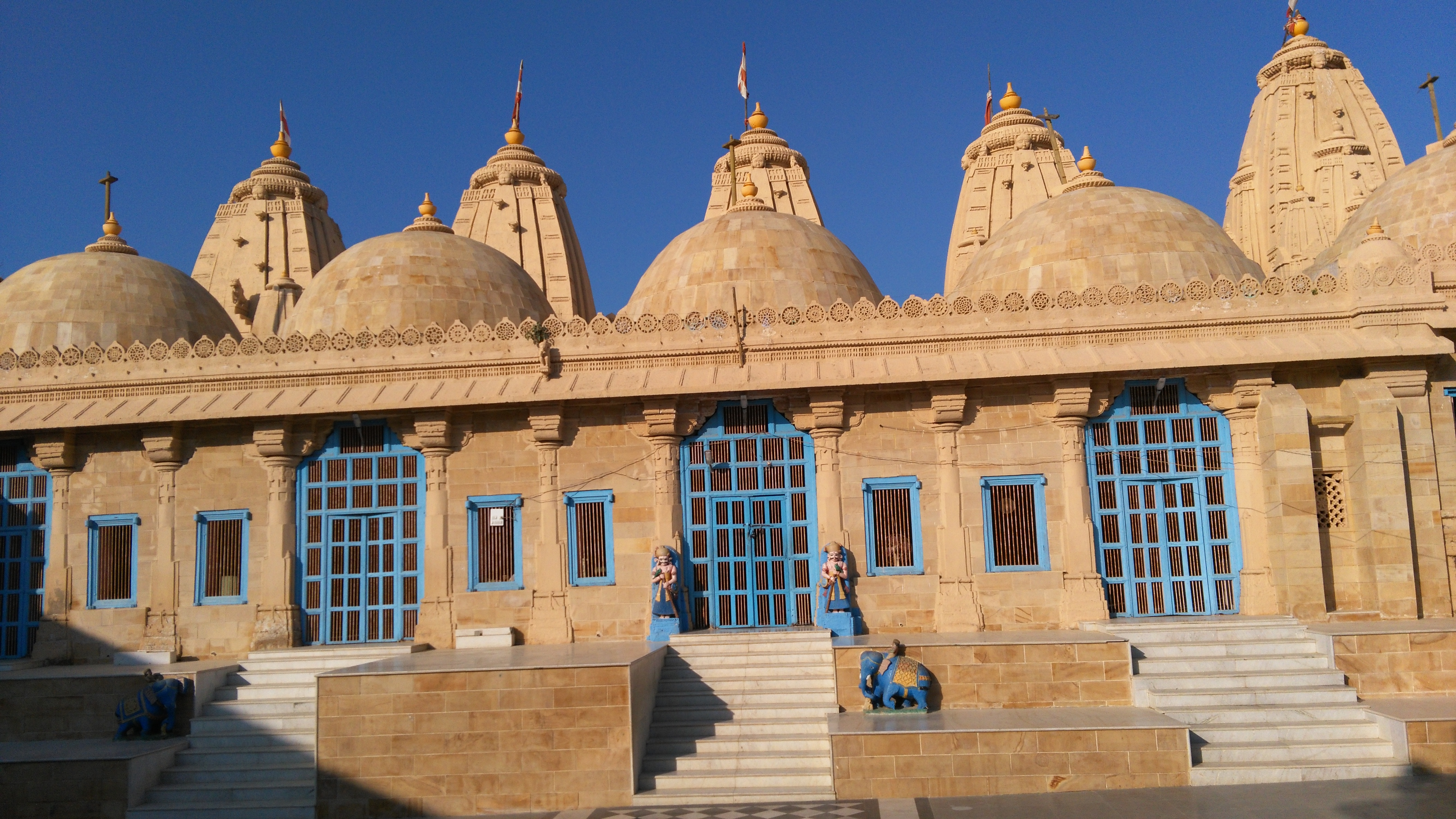
Temple at Narayan sarovar

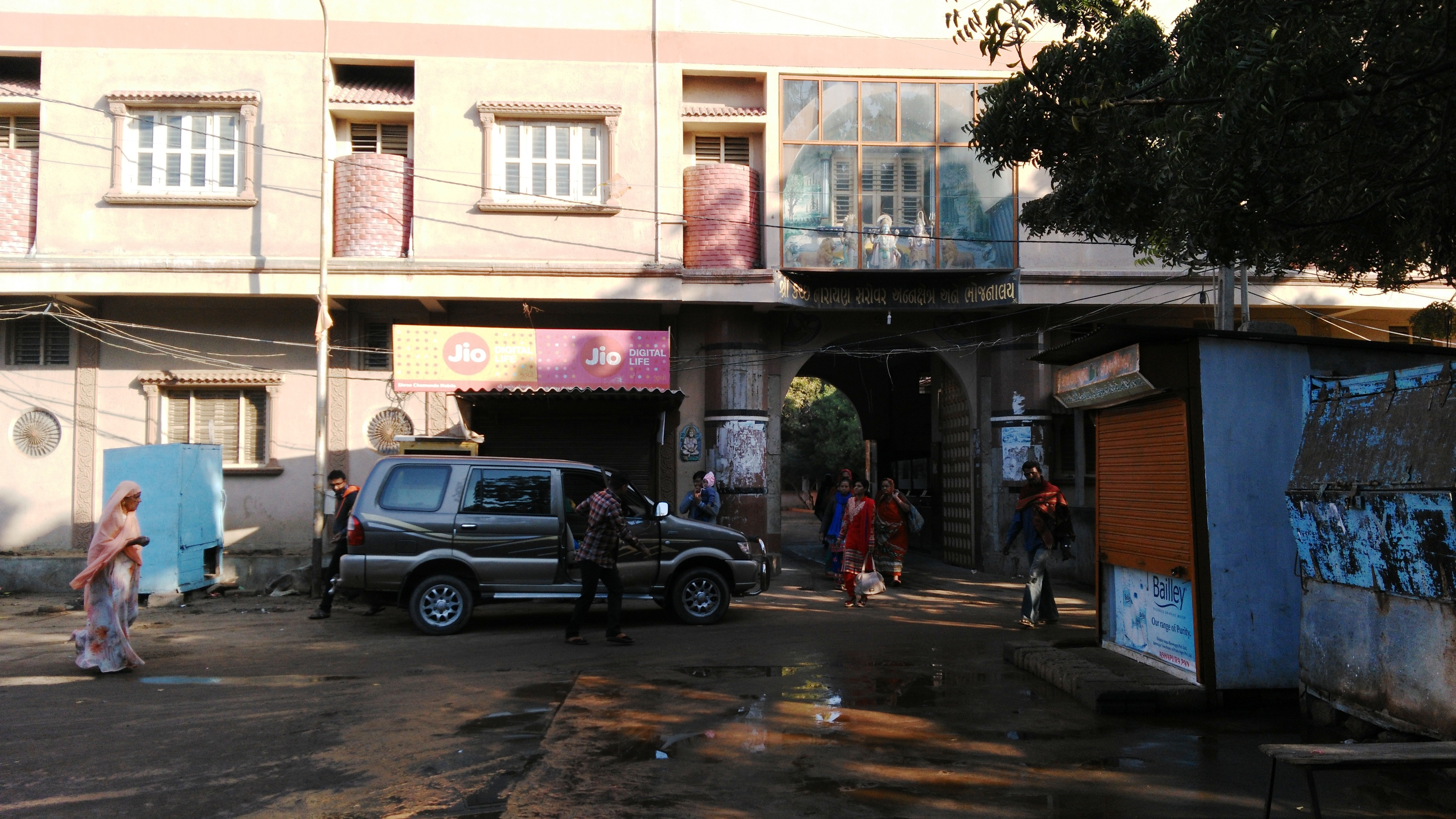
Guesthouse and Bhojanalay at Narayan Sarovar

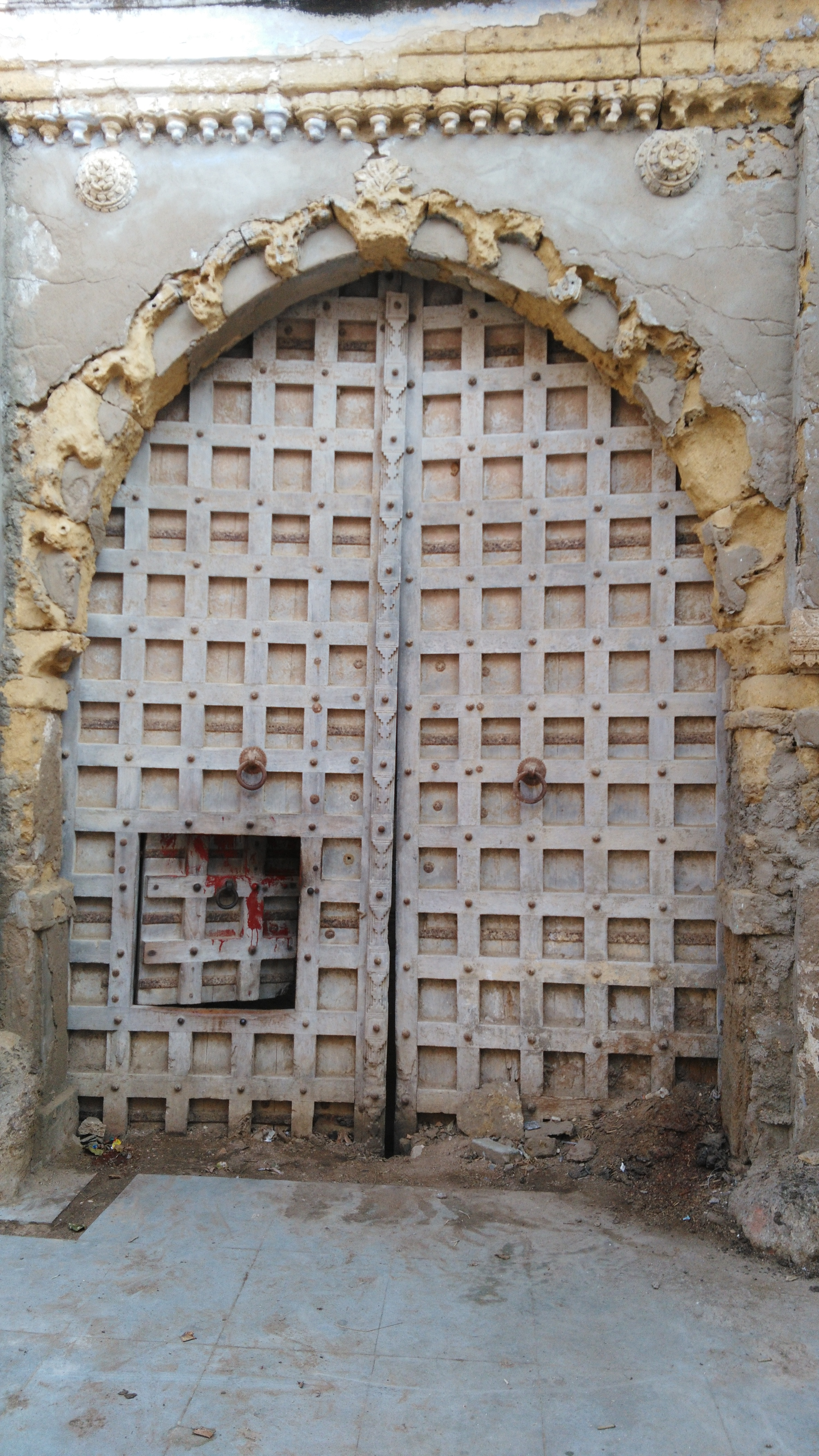
Old Entry gate

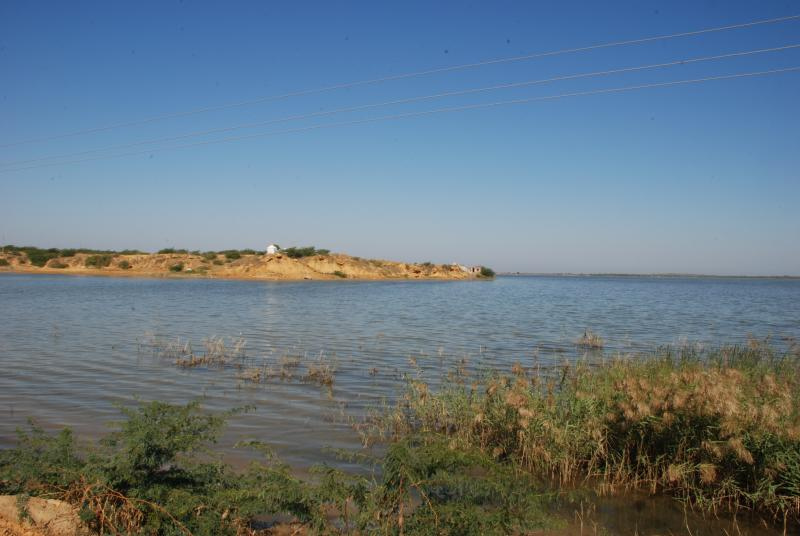
Narayan Sarovar

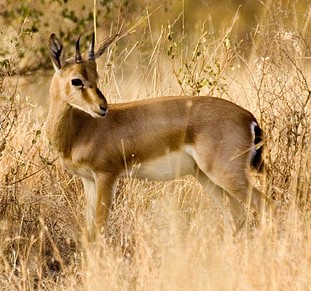
Chinkara at Narayan Sarovar Sanctuary
